= French cruiser Victor Hugo =

French Leon Gambetta-class cruiser

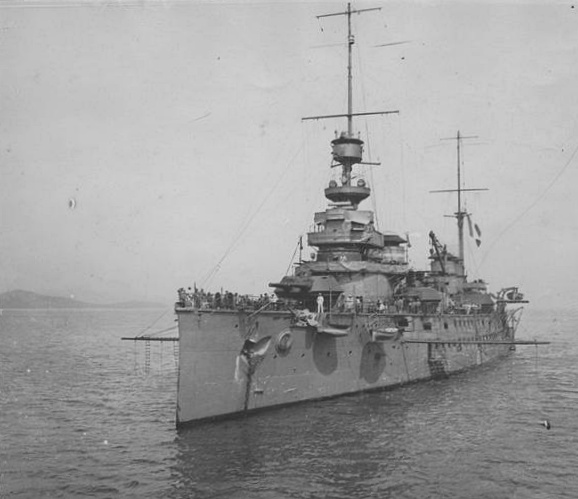
- Victor Hugo in Corfu in 1916

History

France
- Name: Victor Hugo
- Namesake: Victor Hugo
- Ordered: 11 March 1901
- Builder: Arsenal de Lorient
- Laid down: 2 March 1903
- Launched: 30 March 1904
- Commissioned: 16 April 1907
- Stricken: 20 January 1928
- Fate: Sold for scrap, 26 November 1930

General characteristics
- Type: Léon Gambetta-class armored cruiser
- Displacement: 12,550 t (12,352 long tons)
- Length: 149.07 m (489 ft 1 in) (o/a)
- Beam: 21.4 m (70 ft 3 in)
- Draft: 8.18 m (26 ft 10 in)
- Installed power: 28 Belleville boilers; 27,500 PS (20,226 kW)
- Propulsion: 3 shafts; 3 triple-expansion steam engines
- Speed: 22 knots (41 km/h; 25 mph)
- Range: 7,500 nmi (13,900 km; 8,600 mi) at 10 knots (19 km/h; 12 mph)
- Complement: 734; 779 as a flagship
- Armament: 2 × twin 194 mm (7.6 in) guns; 6 × twin, 4 × single 164 mm (6.5 in) guns; 24 × single 47 mm (1.9 in) guns; 2 × 450 mm (17.7 in) torpedo tubes; 20 naval mines
- Armor: Waterline belt: 80–150 mm (3.1–5.9 in); Deck: 33–65 mm (1.3–2.6 in); Main-gun turrets: 138 mm (5.4 in); Conning tower: 174 mm (6.9 in)

The French cruiser Victor Hugo was the last of three Léon Gambetta-class armored cruisers built for the French Navy (Marine Nationale) during the first decade of the 20th century. Armed with four 194-millimeter (7.6 in) guns, the ships were much larger and more powerfully-armed than their predecessors. Completed in 1907, she was assigned to the Mediterranean Squadron (Escadre de la Méditerranée).

During World War I, Victor Hugo escorted convoys as well as the capital ships of the French fleet. The ship participated in the blockade of the Austro-Hungarian Navy in the Adriatic Sea until 1917 when she was reduced to reserve. Four years later, the cruiser was reactivated; she served in the Far East in 1922–1923 and went back into reserve upon her return. Victor Hugo was sold for scrap in 1930.

== Description ==
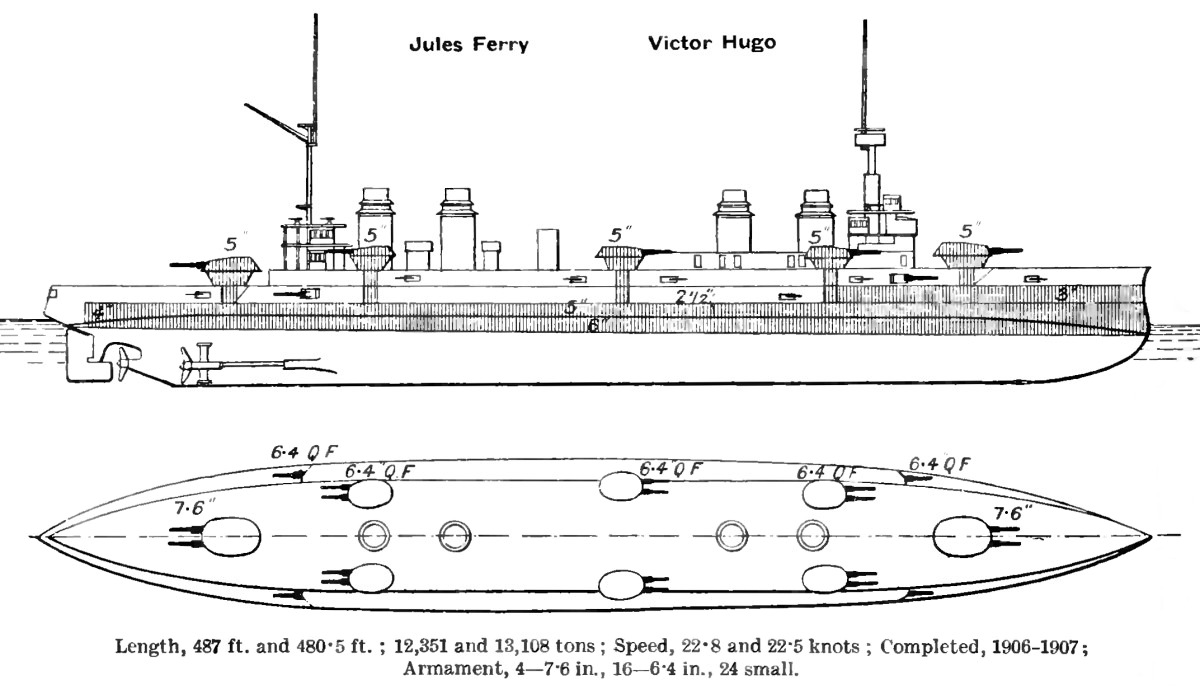
Right elevation and deck plan as depicted in Brassey's Naval Annual 1923

The Léon Gambetta-class ships were designed as enlarged and more powerful versions of the Gloire-class armored cruisers. Victor Hugo, the last ship to be built, was slightly longer than her sister ships Léon Gambetta and Jules Ferry and measured 149.07 meters (489 ft 1 in) overall, with a beam of 21.4 meters (70 ft 3 in) and a draft of 8.18 meters (26 ft 10 in). The sisters were designed to displace 12,550 metric tons (12,350 long tons) at normal load. Their crew normally numbered 26 officers and 708 enlisted men, or 30 officers and 749 men when serving as a flagship.

The ships had three vertical triple-expansion steam engines, each driving one propeller shaft. Each of the sisters used a different model of water-tube boiler and Victor Hugo was fitted with 28 Belleville boilers. The engines were rated at a total of 27,500 metric horsepower (20,200 kW) to reach their designed speed of 22 knots (41 km/h; 25 mph). During her sea trials on 2 March 1907, Victor Hugo reached 22.3 knots (41.3 km/h; 25.7 mph) from 28,344 metric horsepower (20,847 kW). The cruisers carried enough coal to give them a range of 7,500 nautical miles (13,900 km; 8,600 mi) at a speed of 10 knots (19 km/h; 12 mph).

The main battery of the Léon Gambetta class consisted of four 194-millimeter Modèle 1893–1896 guns mounted in twin-gun turrets fore and aft of the superstructure. Their secondary armament comprised sixteen 164-millimeter (6.5 in) Modèle 1893–1896M guns. Twelve of these were in three twin-gun turrets on each broadside and the remaining four guns were in casemates in the hull. Unlike her sisters, Victor Hugo was fitted with twenty-four 47-millimeter (1.9 in) Canon de 47 mm modèle 1902 guns for defense against torpedo boat. She was also armed with two submerged 450-millimeter (17.7 in) torpedo tubes, one on each broadside, and could carry 20 naval mines.

The cruisers' waterline armor belt ranged in thickness from 80 to 150 millimeters (3.1 to 5.9 in) and the main-gun turrets were protected by armor 138 millimeters (5.4 in) thick. Their deck armor was 33 to 65 mm (1.3 to 2.6 in) thick. The front and side sides of the conning tower consisted of 174-millimeter (6.9 in) armor plates.

== Construction and career ==
Named after the novelist Victor Hugo, Jean Marie Antoine de Lanessan, Minister of the Navy, ordered the Arsenal de Toulon to begin work on the ship on 11 March 1901 in compliance with the recently passed Naval Law (Statut Naval). The order was transferred to the Arsenal de Lorient on 3 June 1902 even though that shipyard was committed to building two of the preceding Gloire-class armored cruisers. Coupled with the need to transport the assembled materials to Lorient, the change delayed her keel laying until 2 March 1903. Victor Hugo was launched on 30 March 1904 and began her sea trials on 15 January 1907. The cruiser was commissioned (armement définitif) on 16 April. Her construction cost 30,748,300 francs.

On 8 May Victor Hugo departed Lorient for Jamestown, Virginia, to participate in the Jamestown Exposition, together with the armored cruiser Kléber and the protected cruiser Chasseloup-Laubat. By 20 May they were visiting New York City; the ships returned to Jamestown on 31 May where they participated in the naval review presided over by President Theodore Roosevelt on 10 June. Upon her return to France later that month, Victor Hugo was assigned to the Light Squadron (Escadre légère) of the Mediterranean Squadron. On 5 October 1909, the French Navy reorganized its forces and redesignated the Mediterranean Squadron as the 1st Squadron (1^{er} Escadre) and the Light Squadron became the 1st Light Division (1^{er} Division légère (DL)). The ship was assigned to the 2nd DL of the 1st Squadron on 4 April 1911 with her sisters, although she was reduced to reserve later in the year. Victor Hugo had been reactivated by 10 February 1912 when she was reassigned to the 2nd DL.

After the Agadir Crisis of 1911, the French and British governments agreed in 1912 that the Royal Navy would defend the northern French coast and the French would concentrate their fleet in the Mediterranean and defend British interests there. The French designated the consolidated fleet the 1st Naval Army (1^{re} Armée Navale) and grouped its two DLs into the 1st Light Squadron.

=== World War I ===
When Imperial Germany declared war on France on 3 August 1914, the ship was still assigned to the 2nd DL. The following day the cruisers were part of the escorting force for a troop convoy from Algiers, French Algeria to Metropolitan France. On 13 August Vice Admiral Augustin Boué de Lapeyrère, commander of Allied forces in the Central Mediterranean, was ordered to begin offensive operations against the Austro-Hungarian fleet in the Adriatic. He decided to break the Austro-Hungarian blockade of the port of Antivari, Montenegro, and to engage any ships operating out of nearby Cattaro. He split his available forces into two groups with the armored cruisers following the Albanian coast and the battleships tracing the Italian coast before cutting across the Adriatic to rendezvous at Antivari on the morning of the 16th. The latter sank the protected cruiser SMS Zenta that morning in the Battle of Antivari as the armored cruisers were coming up from the south.

At the end of the month, the French began intermittently escorting single cargo ships to Antivari, usually escorted by the armored cruisers and covered by the main battlefleet. The first of these was on 1 September when four armored cruisers escorted the steamship Liamone while the battleships bombarded the defenses of Cattaro. The 2nd DL escorted the cargo ship Henri Fraissinet as it brought long-range artillery pieces to Antivari on 18–19 September. On the return voyage, they took advantage of the fog to bombard Cattaro before they were forced to withdraw by heavy return fire. The 2nd DL participated in the next sortie into the Adriatic on 17 October, but it was uneventful. During the following mission, begun at the end of October, the 2nd DL raided the island of Lastovo on 2 November and Jules Ferry was narrowly missed by U-5, an Austro-Hungarian U-boat, on the return voyage the following day. The torpedoing of the dreadnought battleship Jean Bart on 21 December brought an end to the sorties into the Adriatic by the battlefleet; henceforth the supply ships were escorted by the armored cruisers or smaller ships. The French also responded by moving their patrol line further south to a line north of the Greek island of Corfu.

Italy signed the Treaty of London on 26 April 1915, agreeing to declare war on Austro-Hungary. Boué de Lapeyrère, concerned about a possible pre-emptive attack on the southern Italian ports, temporarily moved all of his armored cruisers, including the three sisters, closer to the Strait of Otranto that day. Léon Gambetta was torpedoed and sunk by U-5 with heavy loss of life on the 27th. After the sinking, Boué de Lapeyrère withdrew his armored cruisers even further south to a patrol line running through the Gerogombos lighthouse on the island of Cephalonia. He also ordered that patrols should be made at a speed of 14 knots (26 km/h; 16 mph), not the leisurely 6 knots (11 km/h; 6.9 mph) used by Léon Gambetta's late captain. After the Italian declaration of war on 23 May, the French ships withdrew further into the Mediterranean and Ionian Seas with the 2nd DL ultimately basing itself at Alexandria, Egypt, Bizerte, French Tunisia, and British Malta; the division was responsible for patrolling the area between Capo Colonna in southern Italy and the easternmost point of the Greek island of Crete.

At the end of 1915, the French and British decided that the Serbian Army's position in Montenegro and Albania was untenable and that it would have to be evacuated. Victor Hugo helped transfer some of the evacuees from Brindisi, Italy, to Bizerte in early January. The Allies occupied the neutral island of Corfu on 9 January to provide a place for the Serbs to recuperate and to rebuild their army. In March, they occupied the Greek island of Argostoli to serve as a base for the battlefleet while the armored cruisers were based further north at Corfu. The Royal Serbian Army was deemed fit for combat in May and the French armored cruisers provided distant cover for the transfer to the Salonica front until it was completed on 15 June. Shortages of coal and trained manpower hampered most training for the rest of the year and became worse in 1917. As tensions rose between the Allies and the neutral Greek government in early 1917, Victor Hugo and the armored cruiser Jules Michelet were tasked to patrol the Gulf of Corinth and prevent any Greek troops from moving from their positions in the Peloponnese across the bridge over the Corinth Canal on 28 April to interfere with Allied operations in Athens. The 2nd DL landed a company of Senegalese troops on 11 June and reinforced them with machine-gun armed sailors until King Constantine I abdicated the following day and a pro-Allied government was installed. On 12 August, the 2nd DL was disbanded with Victor Hugo reduced to reserve at Bizerte and Jules Ferry was assigned to transport duties for the next year.

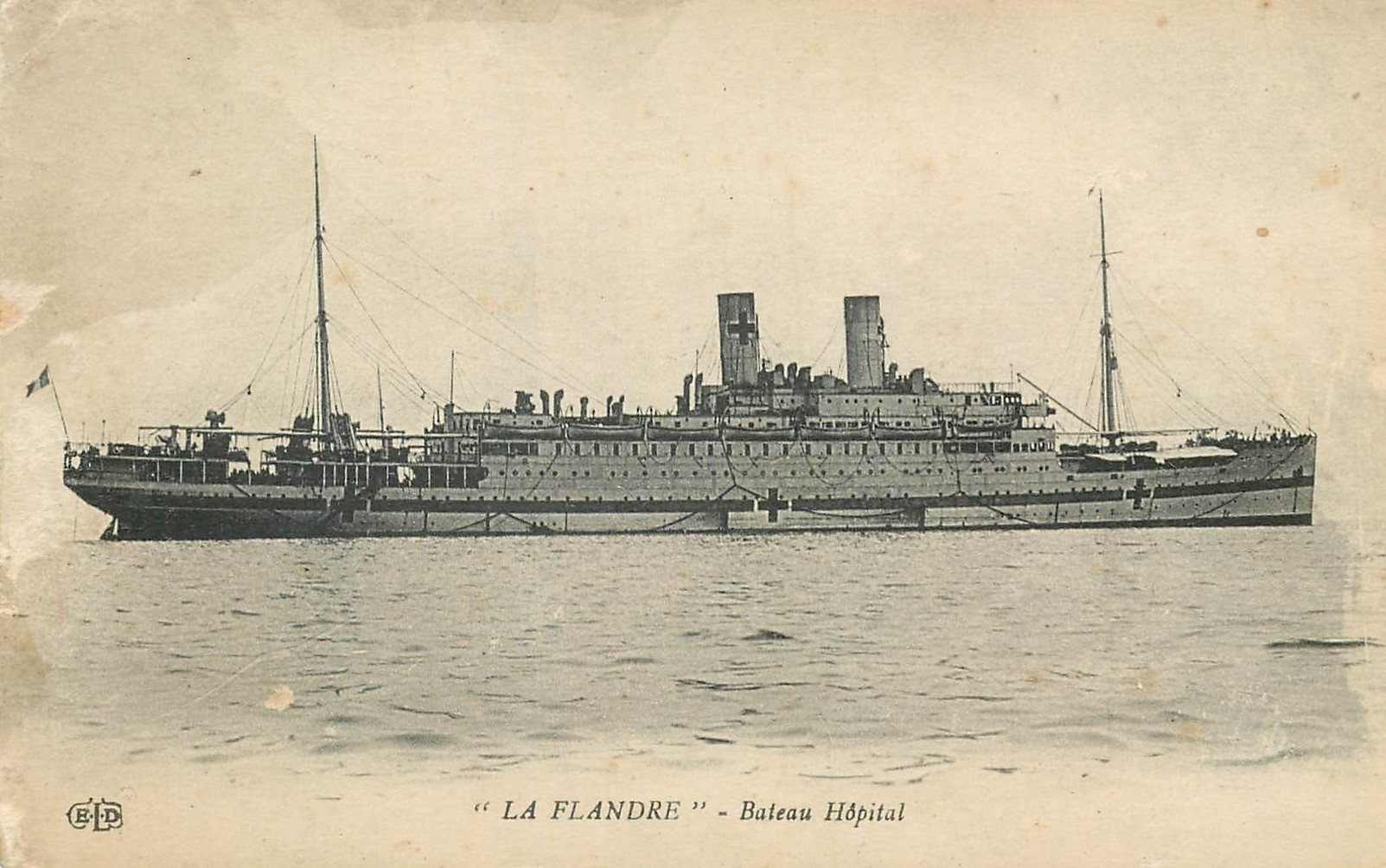
The hospital ship Flandre, which collided with Victor Hugo in Corfu in 1918

On 18 December 1918 Victor Hugo was in Corfu when the hospital ship Flandre dragged her anchor and collided with her. Flandre's hull was damaged, and she went to Toulon to be repaired.

Victor Hugo was reactivated in 1921 and assigned to the Atlantic Flying Division (Division volante de l'Atlantique). The following year she was transferred to the Far Eastern Division (Division navale de l'Extrême Orient). Departing on 12 October 1922 with Jules Michelet, they arrived in Saigon, French Indochina, on 19 April 1923. Her service there was uneventful and the ship arrived back in Toulon on 11 July at which time she was placed in reserve. Victor Hugo was stricken from the Navy List on 20 January 1928 and sold for scrap on 26 November 1930.

== Bibliography ==
- Chesneau, Roger & Kolesnik, Eugene M, eds. (1979). Conway's All the World's Fighting Ships 1860–1905. New York: Mayflower Books. ISBN 0-8317-0302-4.
- Dufeil, Yves; Le Bel, Franck; Terraillon, Marc (2008). Croiseur auxiliaire Transport des troupes Navire hôpital Flandre (PDF) (in French). Navires de la Grande Guerre 1914–1918.
- Freivogel, Zvonimir (2019). The Great War in the Adriatic Sea 1914–1918. Zagreb: Despot Infinitus. ISBN 978-953-8218-40-8.
- Halpern, Paul G (2004). The Battle of the Otranto Straits: Controlling the Gateway to the Adriatic in World War I. Bloomington, IN: Indiana University Press. ISBN 0-253-34379-8.
- Jordan, John & Caresse, Philippe (2019). French Armoured Cruisers 1887–1932. Barnsley: Seaforth Publishing. ISBN 978-1-5267-4118-9.
- Sieche, Erwin F (1990). "Austria-Hungary's Last Visit to the USA". Warship International. XXVII (2): 142–164. ISSN 0043-0374.
- Silverstone, Paul H (1984). Directory of the World's Capital Ships. New York: Hippocrene Books. ISBN 0-88254-979-0.
