= Léon Gambetta (disambiguation) =

Léon Gambetta (1838–1882) was a French statesman.

Léon Gambetta may also refer to:

- French cruiser Léon Gambetta, French armoured cruiser, launched in 1901 and torpedoed in 1915
- Léon Gambetta-class cruiser, a class of armoured cruisers of the French Navy, including Léon Gambetta, Jules Férry, and Victor Hugo
