= French cruiser Jules Ferry =

French Leon Gambetta-class cruiser

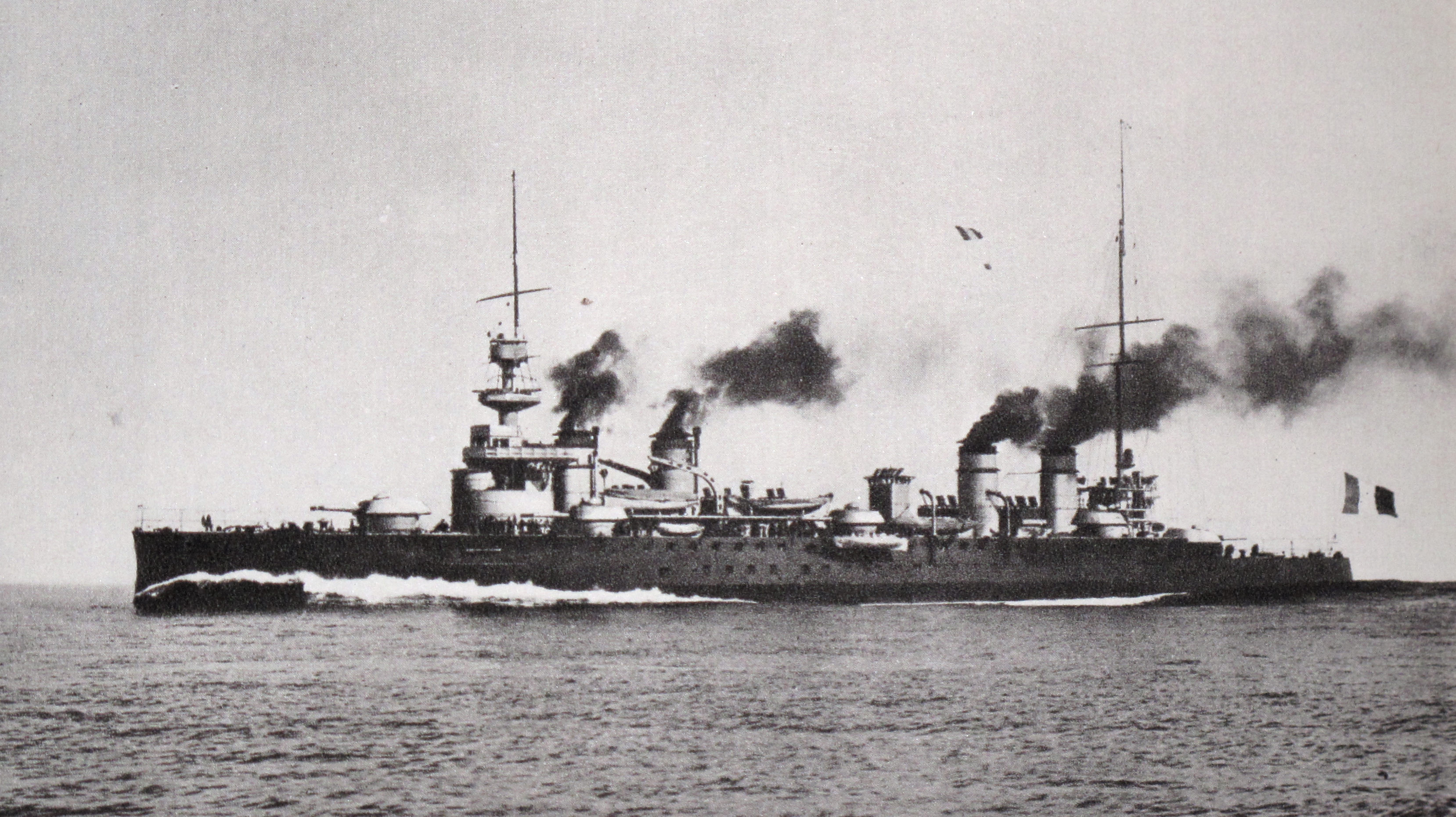
- Jules Ferry at sea, 1905–1911

History

France
- Name: Jules Ferry
- Namesake: Jules Ferry, French statesman
- Ordered: 28 June 1900
- Builder: Arsenal de Cherbourg
- Cost: 29,897,875FF
- Laid down: 19 August 1901
- Launched: 23 August 1903
- Commissioned: 1 June 1907
- Stricken: 19 January 1927
- Fate: Sold for scrap, 1928

General characteristics
- Class & type: Léon Gambetta-class armored cruiser
- Displacement: 12,550 t (12,352 long tons)
- Length: 148.35 m (486 ft 9 in) (o/a)
- Beam: 21.4 m (70 ft 3 in)
- Draft: 8.18 m (26 ft 10 in)
- Installed power: 20 Guyot-du Temple boilers; 27,500 PS (20,226 kW)
- Propulsion: 3 shafts; 3 triple-expansion steam engines
- Speed: 22 knots (41 km/h; 25 mph)
- Range: 7,500 nmi (13,900 km; 8,600 mi) at 10 knots (19 km/h; 12 mph)
- Complement: 734; 779 as a flagship
- Armament: 2 × twin 194 mm (7.6 in) guns; 6 × twin, 4 × single 164 mm (6.5 in) guns; 24 × single 47 mm (1.9 in) Hotchkiss guns; 2 × 450 mm (17.7 in) torpedo tubes; 10 naval mines
- Armor: Waterline belt: 80–150 mm (3.1–5.9 in); Deck: 33–65 mm (1.3–2.6 in); Main gun turrets: 138 mm (5.4 in); Conning tower: 174 mm (6.9 in)

Jules Ferry was the second of three Léon Gambetta-class armored cruisers built for the French Navy (Marine Nationale) during the first decade of the 20th century. Armed with four 194-millimetre (7.6 in) guns, the ships were much larger and more powerfully armed than their predecessors. Completed in 1907, she was assigned to the Mediterranean Squadron (Escadre de la Méditerranée) where she served as a flagship.

During World War I, Jules Ferry escorted convoys as well as the capital ships of the French fleet. The ship participated in the blockade of the Austro-Hungarian Navy in the Adriatic Sea until 1917 when she began serving as a transport. She was reduced to reserve shortly before the end of the war in late 1918. Three years later, the cruiser was reactivated; she served in the Far East in 1923–1925 and returned to reserve upon her return. Jules Ferry was sold for scrap in 1928.

== Description ==
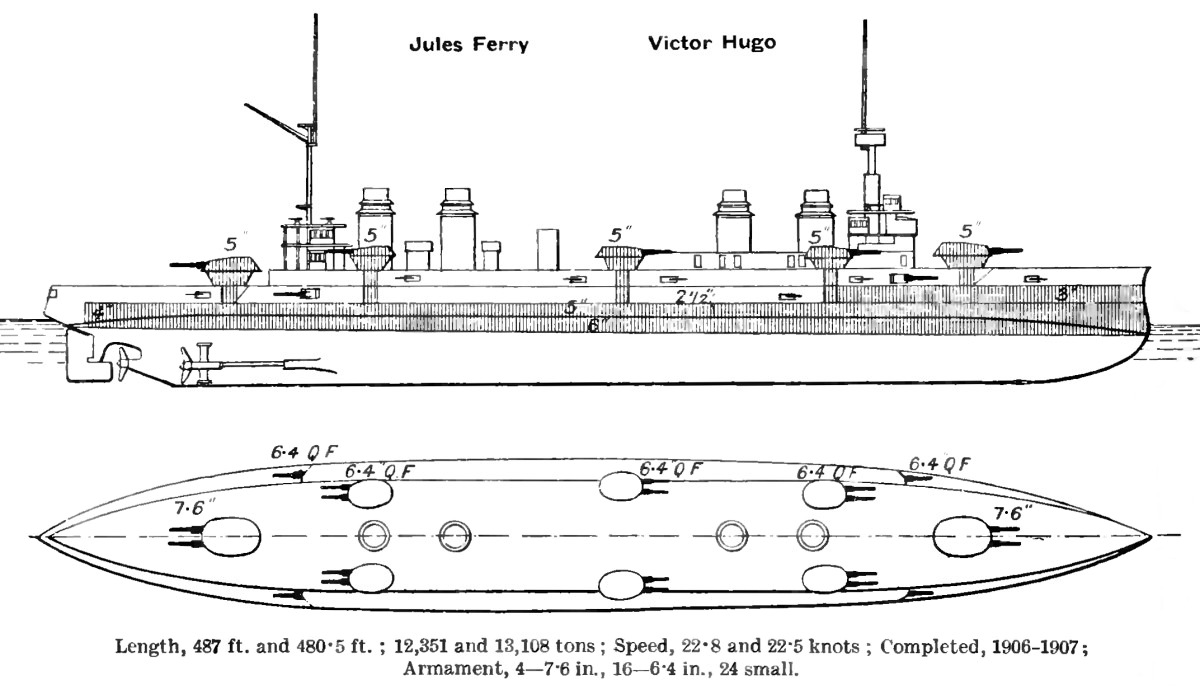
Right elevation and deck plan as depicted in Brassey's Naval Annual 1923

The Léon Gambetta-class ships were designed as enlarged and more powerful versions of the Gloire-class armored cruisers. The first two ships (Léon Gambetta and Jules Ferry) measured 148.35 meters (486 ft 9 in) overall, with a beam of 21.4 meters (70 ft 3 in) and a draft of 8.18 meters (26 ft 10 in). All three sister ships were designed to displace 12,550 metric tons (12,352 long tons) at normal load. Their crew normally numbered 26 officers and 708 enlisted men, or 30 officers and 749 men when serving as a flagship.

The ships had three vertical triple-expansion steam engines, each driving one propeller shaft. Each of the sisters used a different model of water-tube boiler and Jules Ferry was fitted with 20 Guyot-du Temple boilers. Their engines were rated at a total of 27,500 metric horsepower (20,200 kW) to reach their designed speed of 22 knots (41 km/h; 25 mph). During her sea trials on 7 December 1906, Jules Ferry reached 22.6 knots (41.9 km/h; 26.0 mph) from 28,743 metric horsepower (21,140 kW). The cruisers carried enough coal to give them a range of 7,500 nautical miles (13,900 km; 8,600 mi) at a speed of 10 knots (19 km/h; 12 mph).

The main battery of the Léon Gambetta class consisted of four 194-millimeter Modèle 1893–1896 guns mounted in twin-gun turrets fore and aft of the superstructure. Their secondary armament comprised sixteen 164-millimeter (6.5 in) Modèle 1893–1896M guns. Twelve of these were in three twin-gun turrets on each broadside and the remaining four guns were in casemates in the hull. For defense against torpedo boats, they carried twenty-four 47-millimeter (1.9 in) Hotchkiss guns. Jules Ferry was also armed with two submerged 450-millimeter (17.7 in) torpedo tubes, one on each broadside, and could carry 10 naval mines.

The cruisers' waterline armor belt ranged in thickness from 80 to 150 millimeters (3.1 to 5.9 in) and the main-gun turrets were protected by armor 138 millimeters (5.4 in) thick. Their deck armor was 33 to 65 mm (1.3 to 2.6 in) thick. The front and sides of the conning tower consisted of 174-millimeter (6.9 in) armor plates.

== Construction and career ==
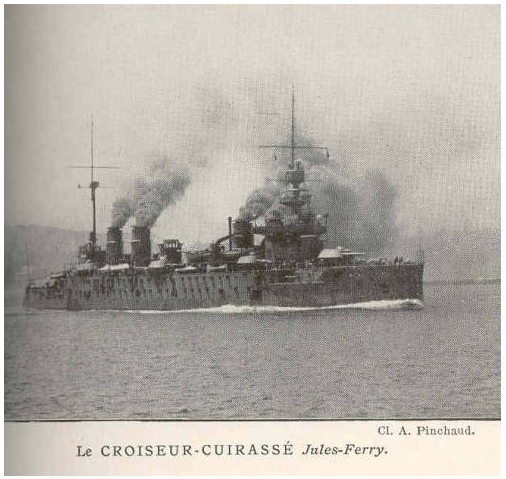
Jules-Ferry underway

The ship was named after Jules Ferry, the former Prime Minister of France, and Jean Marie Antoine de Lanessan, Minister of the Navy, ordered the Arsenal de Cherbourg to begin work on the ship on 28 June 1900 in compliance with the recently passed Naval Law (Statut Naval). She was laid down on 19 August 1901, launched on 23 August 1903 and began her preliminary sea trials on 23 June 1905. Her propulsion machinery was plagued by troubles and her full-power steam trials did not begin until December 1906. The ship was commissioned (armement définitif) on 1 June 1907. Her construction cost 28,897,875 francs.

Jules Ferry was assigned to the Light Squadron (Escadre légère) of the Mediterranean Squadron upon her completion and she became the flagship of Vice Admiral (Vice-amiral) Jules François Joseph Krantz, the squadron commander. He remained in command until mid-1909 when he was relieved by Vice Admiral Louis-Joseph Pivet. On 5 October 1909, the French Navy reorganized its forces and redesignated the Mediterranean Squadron as the 1st Squadron (1^{er} Escadre) and the Light Squadron became the 1st Light Division (1^{er} Division légère (DL)). Jules Ferry was replaced as the 1st DL's flagship by Léon Gambetta by 4 April 1911 She had been transferred to the 2nd DL of the newly formed 2nd Squadron by 4 September when she temporarily served as the flagship of Vice Admiral Horace Jauréguiberry during the fleet review by Armand Fallières, President of France, and the Navy Minister, Théophile Delcassé, that day off Toulon.

After the Agadir Crisis of 1911, the French and British governments agreed in 1912 that the Royal Navy would defend the northern French coast and France would concentrate her fleet in the Mediterranean and defend British interests there. The French designated the consolidated fleet the 1st Naval Army (1^{re} Armée Navale) and grouped its two DLs into the 1st Light Squadron.

=== World War I ===
When Imperial Germany declared war on France on 3 August 1914, the ship was still assigned to the 2nd DL. The following day the cruisers were part of the escorting force for a troop convoy from Algiers, French Algeria to Metropolitan France. On 13 August Vice Admiral Augustin Boué de Lapeyrère, commander of the Allied forces in the Central Mediterranean, was ordered to begin offensive operations against the Austro-Hungarian fleet in the Adriatic. He decided to break the Austro-Hungarian blockade of the port of Antivari, Montenegro, and to engage any ships operating out of nearby Cattaro. He split his available forces into two groups with the armored cruisers following the Albanian coast and the battleships tracing the Italian coast before cutting across the Adriatic to rendezvous at Antivari on the morning of the 16th. The latter group sank the protected cruiser SMS Zenta that morning in the Battle of Antivari as the armored cruisers were coming up from the south.

At the end of the month, the French began intermittently escorting single cargo ships to Antivari, usually escorted by the armored cruisers and covered by the main battlefleet. The first of these was on 31 September when four armored cruisers escorted the steamer SS Liamone while the battleships bombarded the defenses of Cattaro. The 2nd DL escorted the cargo ship SS Henri Fraissinet as it brought long-range artillery pieces to Antivari on 18–19 September. On the return voyage, they took advantage of the fog to bombard Cattaro before they were forced to withdraw by the heavy return fire. The 2nd DL participated in the next sortie into the Adriatic on 17 October, but it was uneventful. During the following mission, begun at the end of October, the 2nd DL raided the island of Lastovo on 2 November and Jules Ferry was narrowly missed by U-5, an Austro-Hungarian U-boat, on the return voyage the following day. The cruiser covered the armored cruiser Jules Michelet as she towed the submarine Curie to the vicinity of Pelagosa on 16 December as the submarine lacked the range to attack the naval base at Pola (modern Pula). The torpedoing of the dreadnought battleship Jean Bart five days later brought an end to the sorties into the Adriatic by the battlefleet; henceforth the supply ships were escorted by the armored cruisers or smaller ships. The French also responded by moving their patrol line further south to a line north of the Greek island of Corfu.

Italy signed the Treaty of London on 26 April 1915, agreeing to declare war on Austro-Hungary. Boué de Lapeyrère, concerned about a possible pre-emptive attack on the southern Italian ports, temporarily moved all of his armored cruisers, including the three sisters, closer to the Strait of Otranto that day. Léon Gambetta was torpedoed and sunk by U-5 with heavy loss of life on the 27th. After the sinking, Boué de Lapeyrère withdrew his armored cruisers even further south to a patrol line running through the Gerogombos lighthouse on the island of Cephalonia. He also ordered that patrols should be made at a speed of 14 knots (26 km/h; 16 mph), not the leisurely 6 knots (11 km/h; 6.9 mph) used by Léon Gambetta's late captain. After the Italian declaration of war on 23 May, the French ships withdrew further into the Mediterranean and Ionian Seas with the 2nd DL ultimately basing itself at Alexandria, Egypt, Bizerte, French Tunisia, and British Malta; the division was responsible for patrolling the area between Capo Colonna in southern Italy and the easternmost point of the Greek island of Crete.

At the end of 1915, the French and British decided that the Serbian position in Montenegro and Albania was untenable and that the army would have to be evacuated. They decided to occupy the neutral island of Corfu to provide a place for the Serbs to recuperate and to rebuild their army. Jules Ferry ferried some of the occupation force to Corfu on 11 January 1916. In March, the Allies decided to occupy the Greek island of Argostoli to serve as a base for the battlefleet while the armored cruisers were based further north at Corfu. The Royal Serbian Army was deemed fit for combat in May and the French armored cruisers provided distant cover for the transfer to the Salonica front until it was completed on 15 June. Shortages of coal and trained manpower hampered most training for the rest of the year and became even worse in 1917. On 12 August, the 2nd DL was disbanded with Jules Ferry assigned to transport duties for the next year and her other sister, Victor Hugo, was reduced to reserve.

Jules Ferry joined her sister in reserve in Bizerte in July 1918; they were reactivated in 1921 and assigned to the Atlantic Flying Division (Division volante de l'Atlantique). Two years later Jules Ferry was transferred to the Far Eastern Division (Division navale de l'Extrême Orient). Departing on 27 September 1923, she arrived in Saigon, French Indochina, on 21 November. Her service there was uneventful and the ship arrived back in Toulon on 10 November 1925 at which time she was placed in reserve. Jules Ferry was stricken from the Navy List on 19 January 1927 and sold for scrap the following year.

== Bibliography ==
- Chesneau, Roger & Kolesnik, Eugene M., eds. (1979). Conway's All the World's Fighting Ships 1860–1905. Greenwich: Conway Maritime Press. ISBN 0-8317-0302-4.
- Freivogel, Zvonimir (2019). The Great War in the Adriatic Sea 1914–1918. Zagreb: Despot Infinitus. ISBN 978-953-8218-40-8.
- Halpern, Paul G. (2004). The Battle of the Otranto Straits: Controlling the Gateway to the Adriatic in World War I. Bloomington, Indiana: Indiana University Press. ISBN 0-253-34379-8.
- Jordan, John & Caresse, Philippe (2019). French Armoured Cruisers 1887–1932. Barnsley, UK: Seaforth Publishing. ISBN 978-1-5267-4118-9.
- Silverstone, Paul H. (1984). Directory of the World's Capital Ships. New York: Hippocrene Books. ISBN 0-88254-979-0.
