= Principe Umberto =

Principe Umberto is Italian for "Prince Umberto" and may refer to:

- Principe Umberto, a Sardinian Royal Navy, and later Italian Royal Navy, steam frigate
- SS Principe Umberto, an Italian cargo ship, and later armed merchant cruiser. built in 1908 and sunk in 1916
- Umberto II of Italy (1904–1983), King of Italy from May to June 1946, previously Prince Umberto
