= SS Flandre (1913) =

French transatlantic liner

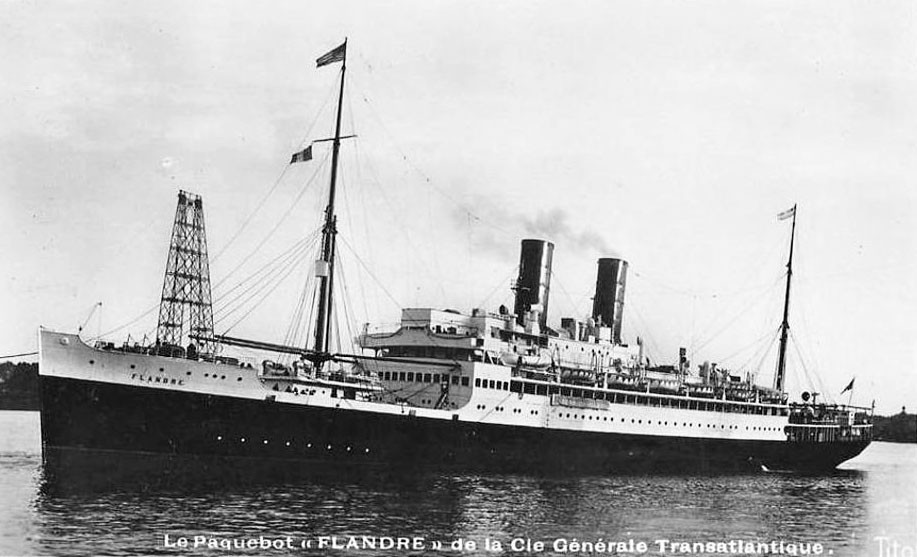
- Flandre in CGT colours

History

France
- Name: Flandre
- Namesake: Flanders
- Owner: CGT
- Operator: 1914–17: CGT; 1917–19: French Navy; 1919–40: CGT; 1940: French Navy
- Port of registry: Saint-Nazaire
- Route: 1914: France – Vera Cruz; 1914–16 France – Senegal – Brazil; 1926–27: Le Havre – Plymouth – Bordeaux – Cristóbal; 1933: Le Havre – Plymouth – Cristóbal (– Puerto Limón)
- Builder: Chantiers de l'Atlantique, St-Nazaire
- Launched: 13 October 1913
- Completed: 1914
- Maiden voyage: 21 May 1914
- Refit: 1917, as hospital ship
- Identification: 1914: code letters JGNK; 1918: call sign FGF; 1922: code letters OHFJ; 1934: call sign FNRY
- Fate: Sunk by mine, 1940

General characteristics
- Type: Ocean liner
- Tonnage: 1914: 8,450 GRT, 4,700 NRT; 1917: 8,503 GRT, 2,898 NRT; 1933: 8,571 GRT, 3,187 NRT
- Length: 1914: 459.4 ft (140.0 m); 1917: 464.4 ft (141.5 m)
- Beam: 1914: 56.8 ft (17.3 m); 1917: 57.0 ft (17.4 m)
- Depth: 1914: 37.1 ft (11.3 m); 1917: 33.4 ft (10.2 m)
- Decks: 5
- Installed power: 12,000 hp
- Propulsion: 4 × screws; 2 × 4-cylinder compound engines; 2 × low-pressure steam turbines
- Speed: 17 knots (31 km/h)
- Sensors & processing systems: by 1926: wireless direction finding

SS Flandre was a French transatlantic ocean liner of the Compagnie Générale Transatlantique. (CGT). She was launched in 1913 and sunk in 1940. Her peacetime route was between France and ports in the Caribbean.

During and after the First World War, Flandre was a hospital ship and then a troop ship. In the Second World War she was a troop ship again. German forces captured her when France capitulated in 1940, but she was sunk less than three months later when she struck a mine.

In June 1939 Flandre took to the Caribbean 310 Jews who had fled Nazi Germany, German-occupied Austria and occupied Czechoslovakia. Both Cuba and Mexico refused admission to 104 of them, who were then sent back to France. Many were later murdered in the Holocaust.

== Design and building ==
In 1911 Chantiers de l'Atlantique in Saint-Nazaire completed Rochambeau, CGT's first ship to be propelled by a combination of reciprocating steam engines and low-pressure steam turbines. Her success led CGT to order further ships with "combination machinery": Flandre from Chantiers de l'Atlantique and Lafayette from Chantiers et Ateliers de Provence. Flandre was launched on 13 October 1913 and completed in 1914. Lafayette was launched in 1914 and completed in 1915.

Like Rochambeau, Flandre had four screws: two driven by reciprocating steam engines, two driven by low-pressure steam turbines, and exhaust steam from the reciprocating engines powered the turbines. But whereas Rochambeau had triple-expansion engines, Flandre had four-cylinder compound engines. Between them, the two sets of engines gave Flandre a top speed of 17 knots (31 km/h) and a service speed of 15.5 knots (28.7 km/h).

Flandre was significantly smaller than Rochambeau and Lafayette. In 1914 her dimensions were registered as 459.4 ft (140.0 m) length, 56.8 ft (17.3 m) beam and 37.1 ft (11.3 m) depth. As built, her tonnages were 8,450 GRT and 4,700 NRT. By 1917 her registered dimensions had been revised to 464.4 ft (141.5 m), 57.0 ft (17.4 m) and 33.4 ft (10.2 m).

CGT registered Flandre in St-Nazaire. Her code letters were JGNK, and by 1918 her wireless telegraph call sign was FGF.

== Early service and First World War ==
On 21 May 1914 Flandre left France on her maiden voyage, which was to Vera Cruz in Mexico.

On 3 August 1914 Germany declared war on France, and the next day the French Navy requisitioned Flandre to be an auxiliary ship. On 6 August she was deployed in the western part of the English Channel to protect elements of the British Expeditionary Force crossing from Britain to France. On 21 August she was returned to her owners.

Also in 1914, CGT took over the Compagnie de Navigation Sud-Atlantique. It put Flandre on the latter's route between France and Brazil via Senegal. Flandre remained on this route until 1916.

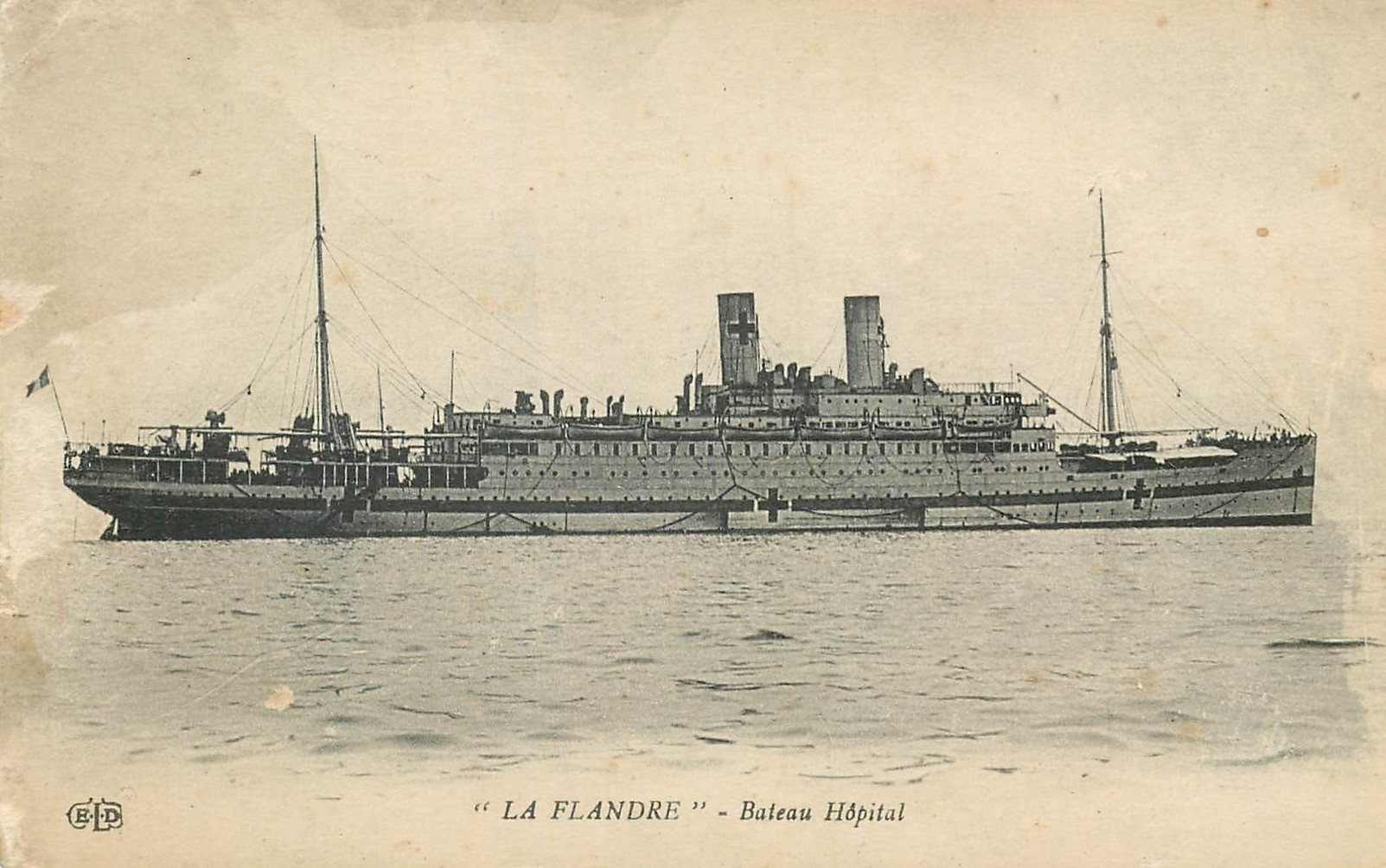
Flandre in the First World War as a hospital ship

On 13 January 1917 Flandre was requisitioned to be a hospital ship. Ateliers et Chantiers de Saint-Nazaire Penhoët undertook the conversion. On 24 March she left St-Nazaire for the Mediterranean, where she supported the Armée d'Orient and the Royal Serbian Army. She made voyages between Salonica in Greece and Toulon in France, with calls at Corfu, Bizerte in Tunisia and Bône in Algeria.

On 20 May 1917 Flandre was in Milo in Sicily when the Portuguese passenger ship Madeira (formerly the Hamburg Südamerikanische liner Petropolis) collided with her. Flandre returned to France and was repaired at La Seyne-sur-Mer.

After the Armistice of 11 November 1918 Flandre undertook medical repatriations of troops. While remaining equipped as a hospital ship she also worked as a troop ship, carrying French soldiers in the Adriatic and the Black Sea, and repatriating Serbian troops. By December 1918, Flandre had made 20 voyages in naval service, and had carried 13,799 patients and troops.

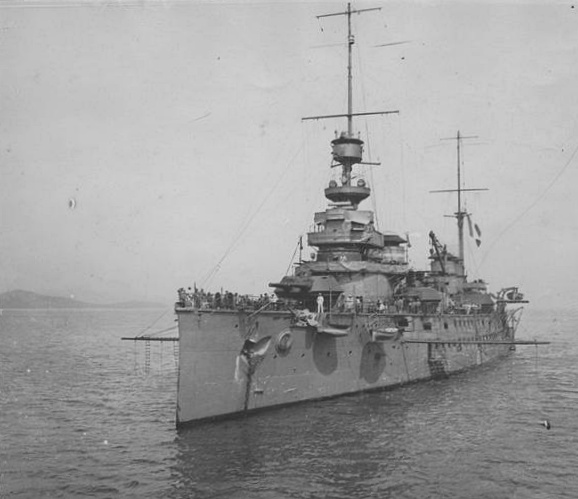
The French cruiser Victor Hugo, with which Flandre collided when at anchor in Corfu in 1918

On 18 December 1918 Flandre was in Corfu when wind caused her to drag her anchor until she collided with the French cruiser Victor Hugo. Flandre's hull was damaged, and she was repaired at Toulon.

In February 1919 Flandre repatriated Senegalese Tirailleurs. She was returned to her owners at the end of July 1919.

== Between the wars ==
By 1922 Flandre's code letters had been changed to OHFJ. By 1926 she was equipped with wireless direction finding.

In the late 1920s Flandre sailed between Le Havre and ports in the Caribbean via Plymouth and Bordeaux. In the 1926–27 season her Caribbean ports of call included Pointe-à-Pitre and Basse-Terre on Guadeloupe, Fort-de-France on Martinique, Trinidad, then Carúpano, La Guaira and Puerto Cabello in Venezuela, Puerto Colombia in Colombia and Cristóbal, Colón in Panama.

Flandre had been built as a coal-burner. In 1933 she was converted to burn oil instead.

In the 1933 season Flandre continued to sail between Le Havre and Cristóbal via Plymouth, Pointe-à-Pitre, Basse-Terre, Fort-de-France, Trinidad, La Guaira and Puerto Colombia, but with some changes to her route. On alternate sailings she continued from Cristóbal to Puerto Limón in Costa Rica. All sailings now included a call at Curaçao. Sailings to and from Puerto Limón included an additional call at Barbados, and called at Carúpano or Puerto Cabello only on the return voyage to Le Havre. On return voyages from Puerto Limón, and in both directions on voyages as far as Cristóbal, Flandre also called at Cartagena, Colombia. She no longer called at Bordeaux, except on outward voyages that were going only as far as Cristóbal. On return voyages from Cristóbal she called at Santander, Spain.

By 1934 the new four-letter call sign FNRY had replaced Flandre's code letters and three-letter call sign.

== Jewish refugees ==
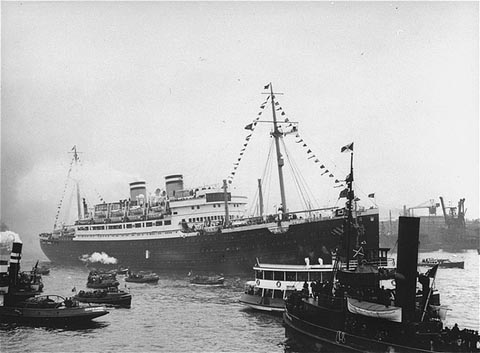
In May 1939 the HAPAG liner St. Louis, seen here in Hamburg, was turned away from Havana one day before Flandre.

On 6 May 1939 President Federico Laredo Brú decreed requiring each immigrant to deposit a $500 bond to be allowed to enter Cuba. This was in order to restrict the number of Jewish refugees entering Cuba from Nazi Germany. On 27 May Cuba turned away 700 Jewish refugees aboard the German liner St. Louis and 67 aboard the British liner Orduña.

On 16 May Flandre left St-Nazaire for the Caribbean carrying 539 passengers, including 310 Jewish refugees from Germany, Austria and Czechoslovakia. She reached Havana on 28 May, the day after St. Louis and Orduña. Cuban immigration authorities refused to let 104 Jewish refugees disembark from Flandre. A brief Pathé News film from the time shows Flandre docked in Havana, with passengers on the ship talking to relatives on the quayside but being unable to disembark.

Flandre continued her voyage with her Jewish refugees still aboard. On 1 June she reached Vera Cruz, where the Mexican government of President Lázaro Cárdenas refused to let 104 of them disembark.

On her return voyage Flandre again called at Havana, where Cuban authorities again refused to let Jewish refugees disembark. Rafael Trujillo, President of the Dominican Republic, was willing to admit Jewish refugees. Jewish leaders asked the Cuban authorities to let Flandre stay in Havana long enough for them to raise funds for the refugees to enter the Dominican Republic. Cuba refused, and ordered that Flandre leave port without delay. On 11 June she left Havana for France, taking back refugees who had been turned away.

In June 1940 France capitulated to Nazi Germany. All of the French Atlantic coast, including St-Nazaire, came under the new German military administration. Jews were ordered to move inland from the coast to Angers, Cholet or Nantes. This included the refugees who had returned to St-Nazaire aboard Flandre a year earlier. In 1942 they were deported to Auschwitz, in some cases via Drancy.

== Second World War ==
After France entered the Second World War in September 1939, Flandre was laid up. After Germany invaded Norway in April 1940, the French Navy requisitioned her as a troop ship to take part of the Corps expéditionnaire français en Scandinavie (CEFS) to Norway. But on 10 May 1940 Germany invaded France, in the first week of June French and Allied troops withdrew from Norway, and Flandre returned to France.

After France capitulated on 22 June, the German occupation authorities requisitioned Flandre at Le Verdon-sur-Mer to use as an auxiliary ship in Operation Sea Lion, the intended amphibious invasion of Britain. On 13 September 1940 she left Bordeaux as part of a convoy, but was grounded by a magnetic mine at the mouth of the Gironde estuary. No-one was killed, but the next day her wreck broke in two.

== Bibliography ==
- Dufeil, Yves; Le Bel, Franck; Terraillon, Marc (2008). Croiseur auxiliaire Transport des troupes Navire hôpital Flandre (PDF) (in French). Navires de la Grande Guerre 1914–1918.
- The Marconi Press Agency Ltd (1918). The Year Book of Wireless Telegraphy and Telephony. London: The Wireless Press, Ltd.
- Lloyd's Register of Shipping. Vol. I–Steamers. London: Lloyd's Register of Shipping. 1914.
- Lloyd's Register of Shipping. Vol. II–Steamers. London: Lloyd's Register of Shipping. 1917 – via Internet Archive.
- Lloyd's Register of Shipping. Vol. II–Steamers. London: Lloyd's Register of Shipping. 1921 – via Internet Archive.
- Lloyd's Register of Shipping. Vol. II–Steamers & Motorships. London: Lloyd's Register of Shipping. 1926 – via Internet Archive.
- Lloyd's Register of Shipping. Vol. II–Steamers & Motorships. London: Lloyd's Register of Shipping. 1935 – via Internet Archive.
- Sardet, Michel (June 2014). "Le Service de Santé de la Marine dans la Guerre 1914–1918 et les évacuations sanitaires par les navires-hôpitaux" (PDF). Bulletin (in French). No. 127. Association Amicale Santé Navale et d'Outremer. pp. 40–46.
