= Italian submarine Nereide (1913) =

World War I submarine of the Italian Royal Navy

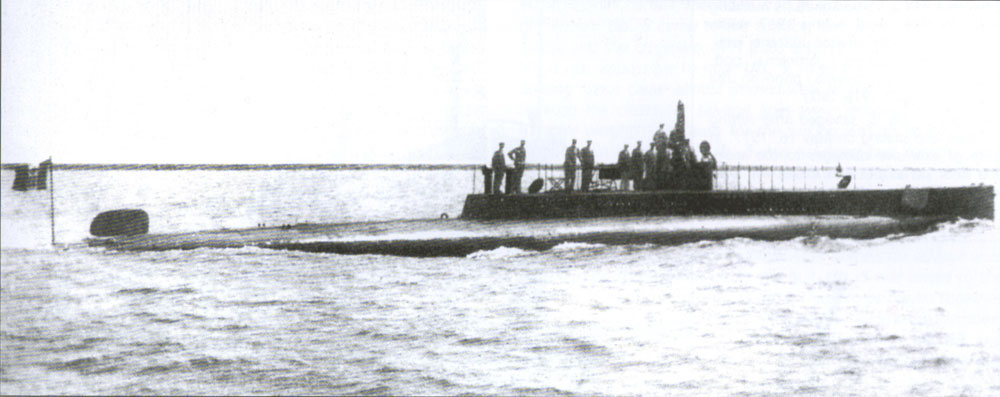
- Nereide

History

Italy
- Name: Nereide
- Builder: Venetian Arsenal, Venice
- Launched: 12 July 1913
- Fate: Sunk 5 August 1915

General characteristics
- Class & type: Nautilus-class submarine
- Displacement: 225 t (248 short tons) surfaced; 320 t (350 short tons) submerged
- Length: 134 ft 4 in (40.94 m)
- Beam: 14 ft 1 in (4.29 m)
- Draft: 9 ft 4 in (2.84 m)
- Propulsion: 2 × shafts; 2 × Sulzer diesel engines, 600 bhp (450 kW) total; 2 × Ansaldo electric motors, 320 hp (240 kW) total
- Speed: 13.2 knots (24.4 km/h) surfaced; 8 knots (15 km/h) submerged
- Complement: 2 officers, 17 enlisted
- Armament: 2 × 17.7 in (450 mm) bow torpedo tubes; 4 torpedoes

Nereide was a Nautilus-class submarine in the Italian Royal Navy (Italian: Règia Marina) during World War I. She was built 1911–1913 at the navy yard at Venice (Italian: Regio Arsenale) and was sunk in 1915 by the Austro-Hungarian submarine U-5 under the command of Georg Ritter von Trapp. Nereide's captain, Carlo del Greco posthumously received the Medaglia d'Oro al Valore Militare for his actions when Nereide was sunk.

== Design and construction ==
The Italian Nautilus was designed by Curio Bernardis, later a well-known submarine designer. Nereide's hull, like that of her sister ship Nautilus, was shaped similar to a torpedo boat. She was 134 feet 4 inches (40.94 m) long with a beam of 14 feet 1 inch (4.29 m) and a draft of 9 feet 4 inches (2.84 m). She was outfitted with two shafts powered by twin 300 bhp (220 kW) Sulzer diesel engines for surface running at up to 13.2 knots (24.4 km/h), and twin 160 hp (120 kW) Ansaldo electric motors for a maximum of 8 knots (15 km/h) when submerged. Nereide was armed with two 17.7-inch (450 mm) bow torpedo tubes and could carry up to 4 torpedoes. She was designed for a complement of 19–2 officers and 17 sailors.

Nereide was laid down at the Venice Navy Yard on 1 August 1911, and was launched on 12 July 1913. It is not known when Nereide was commissioned, but it was most likely after her completion on 20 December 1913. Little is known about Nereide's service career in the Règia Marina before August 1915.

== Sinking ==
Location of the wreck

After Italy's entry into World War I, the country's armed forces occupied the island of Pelagosa in the central Adriatic. After scouting reports from the German submarine UB-14 and from an Austro-Hungarian reconnaissance aircraft reported a French or Italian submarine—which was, in fact, Nereide—at Pelagosa in early August 1915, the Austro-Hungarian Navy dispatched its submarine U-5, under the command of Georg Ritter von Trapp, (Note: Georg Ritter von Trapp was the patriarch of the von Trapp family made famous in The Sound of Music.) from nearby Lissa. On the morning of 5 August, Nereide was on the surface, moored under a cliff in the island's harbor.

When U-5 surfaced just offshore, Nereide's commanding officer, Capitano di Corvetta Carlo del Greco, cast off the lines and maneuvered to get a shot at von Trapp's boat. Nereide launched a torpedo at U-5 but missed, after which del Greco ordered his boat down. U-5 lined up a shot and launched a single torpedo at the slowly submerging target, striking her, and sending her to the bottom with all hands. (Note: Stern (p. 40) reports 20 men were killed when Nereide went down; Sieche (p. 22) reports a loss of 17.) Carlo del Greco received the Medaglia d'Oro al Valore Militare for his actions. Nereide's wreck was located in 1972 at position 42°23′N 16°16′E.

== Bibliography ==
- Gardiner, Robert, ed. (1985). Conway's All the World's Fighting Ships 1906–1921. Annapolis, Maryland: Naval Institute Press. ISBN 978-0-87021-907-8. OCLC 12119866.
- Halpern, Paul G. (1994). A Naval History of World War I. Annapolis, Maryland: Naval Institute Press. ISBN 978-1-55750-352-7. OCLC 57447525.
- Stern, Robert Cecil (2007). The Hunter Hunted: Submarine versus Submarine: Encounters from World War I to the Present. Annapolis, Maryland: Naval Institute Press. ISBN 978-1-59114-379-6. OCLC 123127537.
- von Trapp, Georg (2007) [1935]. To the Last Salute: Memories of an Austrian U-Boat Commander. Lincoln: University of Nebraska Press. ISBN 978-0-8032-4667-6. OCLC 70866865.
