= Léon Gambetta-class cruiser =

French Navy's Léon Gambetta class of three armored cruisers

- Léon Gambetta

Class overview
- Name: Léon Gambetta-class cruiser
- Operators: French Navy
- Preceded by: Gloire class
- Succeeded by: Jules Michelet
- Built: 1901–1907
- In commission: 1905–1928
- Completed: 3
- Lost: 1
- Scrapped: 2

General characteristics
- Type: Armored cruiser
- Displacement: 12,550 t (12,352 long tons)
- Length: 148.35–149.07 m (486 ft 9 in – 489 ft 1 in) (o/a)
- Beam: 21.4 m (70 ft 3 in)
- Draft: 8.18 m (26 ft 10 in)
- Installed power: 20 or 28 water-tube boilers; 27,500 PS (20,226 kW)
- Propulsion: 3 shafts; 3 triple-expansion steam engines
- Speed: 22 knots (41 km/h; 25 mph)
- Range: 7,500 nmi (13,900 km; 8,600 mi) at 10 knots (19 km/h; 12 mph)
- Complement: 734; 779 as a flagship
- Armament: 2 × twin 194 mm (7.6 in) guns; 6 × twin, 4 × single 164 mm (6.5 in) guns; 24 × single 47 mm (1.9 in) Hotchkiss guns; 2 or 5 × 450 mm (17.7 in) torpedo tubes; 10 or 20 naval mines
- Armor: Waterline belt: 80–150 mm (3.1–5.9 in); Deck: 33–65 mm (1.3–2.6 in); Main gun turrets: 138 mm (5.4 in); Secondary gun turrets: 102 mm (4 in); Casemates: 102 mm (4 in); Conning tower: 174 mm (6.9 in)

The Léon Gambetta class consisted of three armored cruisers built for the French Navy (Marine Nationale) during the first decade of the 20th century. Armed with four 194-millimeter (7.6 in) guns, the ships were much larger and more powerfully armed than their predecessors. Léon Gambetta, the first of the sister ships to be completed, was initially assigned to the Northern Squadron (Escadre du Nord) where she served as a flagship. Her sisters Jules Ferry and Victor Hugo were assigned to the Mediterranean Squadron (Escadre de la Méditerranée) where Jules Ferry also served as a flagship. Léon Gambetta joined them there in 1910 and the sisters remained there for most of their careers.

During World War I, the cruisers escorted convoys as well as the capital ships of the French fleet. The ships participated in the blockade of the Austro-Hungarian Navy in the Adriatic Sea until 1917. Léon Gambetta was sunk by an Austro-Hungarian submarine in April 1915 with heavy loss of life. In mid-1917, Jules Ferry became a transport and Victor Hugo was reduced to reserve. She was joined by her sister in mid-1918.

They were reactivated in 1921 to serve with the Atlantic Flying Division (Division volante de l'Atlantique). In 1922–1925, the sisters alternated service in the Far East, but were again placed in reserve upon their return. Jules Ferry was sold for scrap in 1928 and Victor Hugo followed two years later.

== Background ==
The French humiliation during the Fashoda Incident of 1898, where the British forced them to withdraw from the Sudan, coupled with the earlier war scare with the British over the navigable portion of the Niger River, forced the French to realize that they were grossly unprepared for war with Britain as they could neither defend their colonies nor break through any British blockade of Metropolitan France. To their credit, the factions in the government and the navy were mostly able stop squabbling amongst themselves to reconsider their naval strategy and the types of ships that they would build.

They realized that the advocates of the Jeune École (Young School) had built enough torpedo craft that the British could no longer maintain their long-time strategy of a close blockade of French ports without risking the loss of their capital ships, which would allow the battleships favored by the traditionalists to sortie and defeat the blockading squadron. Countering this with a distant blockade strategy would require the British to keep their capital ships at home to react to any attempt by the French to break out en masse. The distant blockade strategy required smaller ships to monitor the ports and notify the battlefleet of any attempt to break out. The armored cruisers favored by the Jeune École for the commerce-raiding role could easily defeat those light forces. The value placed by the new strategy (French: marine de pauvre, lit. 'poor man's navy') on the armored cruiser was reflected in the Naval Law (Statut Naval) of 1900 with a requirement for a new generation of five ships, of which the first three became the Léon Gambetta class.

== Design and description ==
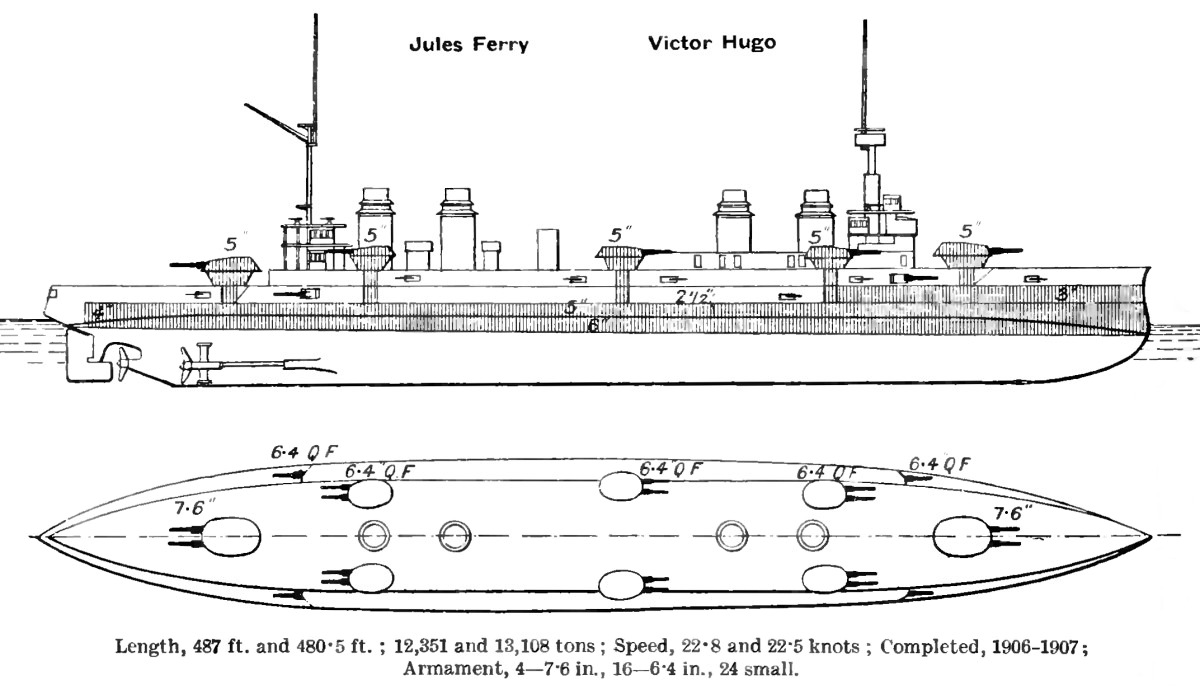
Right elevation and deck plan as depicted in Brassey's Naval Annual 1923

The Gambettas were designed as enlarged and more powerful versions of the Gloire-class armored cruisers. The first two ships (Léon Gambetta and Jules Ferry) measured 148.35 meters (486 ft 9 in) overall, with a beam of 21.4 meters (70 ft 3 in) and a draft of 8.18 meters (26 ft 10 in); the third and last ship (Victor Hugo) was slightly longer at 149.07 meters (489 ft 1 in). The sisters were designed to displace 12,550 metric tons (12,352 long tons) at normal load. Their crew normally numbered 26 officers and 708 enlisted men, or 30 officers and 749 men when serving as a flagship.

The ships were powered by a trio of four-cylinder vertical triple-expansion steam engines, each driving one propeller shaft. The outer shafts had 5.5-meter (18 ft 1 in) propellers while the centre propeller had a diameter of 5 meters (16 ft 5 in). The engines were rated at a total of 27,500 metric horsepower (20,200 kW), using steam provided by 20 (Jules Ferry) or 28 water-tube boilers. Each of the sisters had a different type of boiler; Léon Gambetta used Niclausse boilers, Jules Ferry had Guyot-du Temple boilers and Victor Hugo was fitted with Belleville boilers. The ships were designed for a speed of 22 knots (41 km/h; 25 mph) and exceeded that figure during their sea trials, reaching 22.3–23 knots (41.3–42.6 km/h; 25.7–26.5 mph) from 28,344–29,029 metric horsepower (20,847–21,351 kW). They carried a maximum of 2,100 long tons (2,100 t) of coal and could steam for 7,500 nautical miles (13,900 km; 8,600 mi) at a speed of 10 knots (19 km/h; 12 mph). Electrical power was supplied by four 1200-ampere dynamos.

=== Armament ===
The main battery of the Léon Gambetta class consisted of four 40-caliber 194-millimeter Modèle 1893–1896 guns mounted in twin-gun turrets fore and aft of the superstructure. The guns fired 75–90.3-kilogram (165–199 lb) shells at muzzle velocities ranging from 770 to 800 meters per second (2,500 to 2,600 ft/s). This gave them a range of about 11,500 meters (12,600 yd) at the turrets' maximum elevation of +15 degrees. Each gun was provided with 100 rounds which it could fire at a rate of two rounds per minute.

The cruisers' secondary armament comprised sixteen 45-caliber 164-millimeter (6.5 in) Modèle 1893–1896M guns. Twelve of these were in three twin-gun turrets on each broadside and the remaining four guns were in casemates in the hull. Their 45–54.9-kilogram (99–121 lb) shells were fired at muzzle velocities of 900 meters per second (3,000 ft/s) at a rate of three rounds per minute. At their maximum elevation of +15 degrees, the casemated guns had a range of 9,000 meters (9,800 yd) and the turret-mounted guns 10,800 meters (11,800 yd). The sisters carried 200 rounds for each gun. For defense against torpedo boats, they carried twenty-four 47-millimeter (1.9 in) Hotchkiss guns, although Victor Hugo used the Canon de 47 mm modèle 1902 instead.

Léon Gambetta was equipped with five 450-millimeter (17.7 in) torpedo tubes. One pair was submerged and the other was above water, both firing on the broadside, and the last tube was above water in the stern. The ship carried sixteen torpedoes for them. Her sisters were not fitted with the above-water tubes and they only carried six torpedoes for their underwater tubes. The first two ships were provided with facilities to handle ten naval mines, while Victor Hugo could handle twenty mines.

=== Protection ===
The Léon Gambetta-class ships were protected by 3,011 metric tons (2,963 long tons) of armour. It consisted of a waterline armour belt of Harvey armour that was 150 millimeters (5.9 in) thick amidships and reduced to 90 millimeters (3.5 in) at the bow and 80 millimeters (3.1 in) at the stern. Its plates were 2.05 meters (6 ft 9 in) tall and tapered to a thickness of 50–70 millimeters (2.0–2.8 in) at their lower edge. Above this was a strake of 130-millimeter (5.1 in) armour that reduced to thicknesses of 80 millimeters at the bow and 70 millimeters at the stern. The plates tapered to 70–120 millimeters (2.8–4.7 in) at their upper edges, with the thinner plates being towards the ends of the ship. Above this was a strake of 40-millimeter (1.6 in) armor that extended from the bow to the end of the forward casemate.

Both of the armored decks consisted of three layers of mild steel plates, of which only the topmost layer was hardened. The upper deck was at the level of the top of the upper strake of armor and its plates were each 11 millimeters (0.43 in) thick. The horizontal portion of the lower armored deck used 15-millimeter (0.59 in) plates; the armor on the sloping part of the deck where it met the lower edge of the waterline armor belt ranged in thickness from 40–65 millimeters (1.6–2.6 in). The aft end of the armored citadel was closed off by a transverse bulkhead that had a total thickness of 100 millimeters (3.9 in).

The main-gun turrets were protected by 138 millimeters (5.4 in) of armor, backed by two layers of 13-millimeter (0.51 in) mild steel plates, on their front and sides; their roofs consisted of three layers of 17-millimeter (0.67 in) mild steel plates, of which only the topmost layer was hardened. The armor plates protecting the secondary turrets were 102 millimeters (4 in) thick and were backed by two layers of 9-millimeter (0.35 in) mild steel. Their roofs had a total thickness of 39 millimeters (1.5 in), arranged in the same manner as the main-gun turrets. The outer wall of the casemates consisted of 102 millimeters of armor and the inner wall was 64 millimeters (2.5 in) of armor backed by two layers of 8-millimeter (0.31 in) plates. The forward end of the forward casemates formed part of a transverse bulkhead that had a total thickness of 120 millimeters (4.7 in). For the first time in a French ship, the barbettes for all of the turrets were in the form of an inverted truncated cone with a total thickness of 164 millimeters for the main-gun turrets and 120 millimeters for the secondary turrets. The front and sides of the conning tower were protected by 174 millimeters (6.9 in) of armor and its rear by 110 millimeters (4.3 in). It had a roof that had a total thickness of 40 millimeters.

== Ships ==
The ships were named after notable statesmen of the French Republic. The Minister of the Navy from 1902 to 1905, Camille Pelletan, chose these names to order to honor left-wing statesmen and activists, as the officers of the French Navy (the so-called "La Royale") were reputed to have rather right-wing Royalist sympathies. Fitting out of the first two ships was prolonged by accidents and mechanical problems, while the transfer of the order for Victor Hugo from the Arsenal de Toulon to the Arsenal de Lorient in 1902 greatly delayed the start of her construction.

Construction data
Name	Builder	Laid down	Launched	Commissioned	Fate
Léon Gambetta	Arsenal de Rochefort	15 January 1901	26 October 1902	21 July 1905	Sunk by SM U-5, 27 April 1915
Jules Ferry	Arsenal de Cherbourg	19 August 1901	23 August 1903	1 June 1907	Sold for scrap, 1928
Victor Hugo	Arsenal de Lorient	2 March 1903	30 March 1904	16 April 1907	Sold for scrap, 26 November 1930

== Service history ==
Léon Gambetta was assigned to the Northern Squadron upon commissioning and became the flagship of the 1st Cruiser Squadron (1^{re} Division de croiseur) while Jules Ferry became the flagship of the Mediterranean Fleet's Light Squadron (Escadre légère) upon completion and was joined by Victor Hugo. Unlike her sisters, the latter ship never served as a flagship. She visited the United States in 1907 to participate in the Jamestown Exposition; the following year Léon Gambetta participated in the Quebec Tercentenary in Canada. After a reorganization of the French Navy and unit redesignations in late 1909, the ship was transferred to the Mediterranean in early 1910 and joined her sisters in the 2nd Light Division (2^{e} Division légère (DL)) by 4 April 1911. Victor Hugo was reduced to reserve shortly afterwards and missed participating in the fleet review by Armand Fallières, President of France, and the Navy Minister, Théophile Delcassé, off Toulon on 4 September with her sisters.

After the Agadir Crisis of 1911, the French and British governments agreed in 1912 that the Royal Navy would defend the northern French coast and the French would concentrate her fleet in the Mediterranean and defend British interests there. The French designated the consolidated fleet the 1st Naval Army (1^{re} Armée Navale) and grouped its two DLs into the 1st Light Squadron.

=== World War I ===
When Imperial Germany declared war on France on 3 August 1914, the 2nd DL was tasked to escort troop convoys and the battlefleet until France declared war on the Austro-Hungarian Empire on the 12th. The following day, Vice Admiral Augustin Boué de Lapeyrère, commander of the Allied forces in the Central Mediterranean, was ordered to begin offensive operations against the Austro-Hungarian fleet in the Adriatic. He split his forces into two groups to break the Austro-Hungarian blockade of the port of Antivari, Montenegro, and to engage any ships operating out of nearby Cattaro. The armored cruisers would follow the Albanian coast and the battleships the Italian coast before cutting across the Adriatic to rendezvous at Antivari on the morning of the 16th. The latter group sank the protected cruiser SMS Zenta that morning in the Battle of Antivari before the armored cruisers could get there.

At the end of the month, the French began intermittently escorting single cargo ships to Antivari, usually escorted by the armored cruisers and covered by the main battlefleet. During one such mission, the 2nd DL raided the island of Lastovo on 2 November and Jules Ferry was narrowly missed by U-5, an Austro-Hungarian U-boat, on the return voyage the following day. The torpedoing of the dreadnought battleship Jean Bart on 21 December brought an end to the sorties into the Adriatic by the battlefleet; henceforth the supply ships were escorted by the armored cruisers or smaller ships. The French also responded by moving their patrol line further south to a line north of the Greek island of Corfu.

Italy signed the Treaty of London on 26 April 1915, agreeing to declare war on Austro-Hungary. Boué de Lapeyrère, concerned about a possible pre-emptive attack on the southern Italian ports, temporarily moved all of his armored cruisers closer to the Strait of Otranto that day. Léon Gambetta was torpedoed and sunk by U-5 with the loss of 684 men out of her crew of 821 the following day. After the sinking, Boué de Lapeyrère withdrew his armored cruisers even further south to a line running through the island of Cephalonia. After the Italian declaration of war on 23 May, the French ships withdrew further into the Mediterranean and Ionian Seas with the 2nd DL ultimately basing itself at Alexandria, Egypt, Bizerte, French Tunisia, and British Malta; the division was responsible for patrolling the area between southern Italy and the Greek island of Crete.

At the end of 1915, the French and British decided that the Serbian position in Montenegro and Albania was untenable and that the army would have to be evacuated. They decided to occupy the neutral island of Corfu to provide a place for the Serbs to recuperate and to rebuild their army. Jules Ferry ferried some of the occupation force to Corfu in January 1916. The Royal Serbian Army was deemed fit for combat in May and the sisters provided distant cover for the transfer to the Salonica front until it was completed on 15 June. Shortages of coal and trained manpower hampered most training for the rest of the year and became even worse in 1917. As tensions rose between the Allies and the neutral Greek government in early 1917, Victor Hugo played a small role in pressuring the Greeks to join the Allies in June. On 12 August, the 2nd DL was disbanded with Jules Ferry assigned to transport duties until July 1918 when she joined Victor Hugo in reserve.

The sisters were reactivated in 1921 and assigned to the Atlantic Flying Division (Division volante de l'Atlantique). Victor Hugo was transferred to the Far Eastern Division (Division navale de l'Extrême Orient) in 1922 and returned to reserve after her return the following year. She was replaced by Jules Ferry which joined her sister in reserve when she returned in 1925. The sisters were stricken from the Navy List in 1927–1928; Jules Ferry was sold for scrap in 1928 and was followed by Victor Hugo two years later.

== Bibliography ==
- Chesneau, Roger & Kolesnik, Eugene M., eds. (1979). Conway's All the World's Fighting Ships 1860–1905. New York: Mayflower Books. ISBN 0-8317-0302-4.
- Dai, Wei (September 2020). "A Discussion on French Armored Cruiser Identification: From the Gueydon Class to the Edgar Quinet Class". Warship International. LVII (3): 199–221. ISSN 0043-0374.
- Freivogel, Zvonimir (2019). The Great War in the Adriatic Sea 1914–1918. Zagreb: Despot Infinitus. ISBN 978-953-8218-40-8.
- Friedman, Norman (2011). Naval Weapons of World War One: Guns, Torpedoes, Mines and ASW Weapons of All Nations: An Illustrated Directory. Barnsley, UK: Seaforth. ISBN 978-1-84832-100-7.
- Halpern, Paul G. (2004). The Battle of the Otranto Straits: Controlling the Gateway to the Adriatic in World War I. Bloomington, Indiana: Indiana University Press. ISBN 0-253-34379-8.
- Jordan, John & Caresse, Philippe (2019). French Armoured Cruisers 1887–1932. Barnsley, UK: Seaforth Publishing. ISBN 978-1-5267-4118-9.
- Ropp, Theodore (1987). Roberts, Stephen S. (ed.). The Development of a Modern Navy: French Naval Policy, 1871–1904. Annapolis, Maryland: Naval Institute Press. ISBN 0-87021-141-2.
- Silverstone, Paul H. (1984). Directory of the World's Capital Ships. New York: Hippocrene Books. ISBN 0-88254-979-0.
