= Victor-Baptistin Senès =

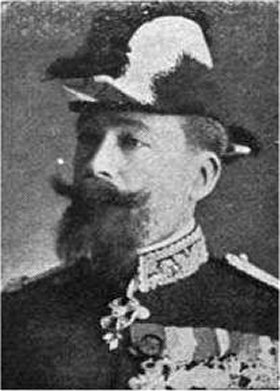
Victor Baptistin Senès

Victor-Baptistin Senès (Toulon, 31 May 1857 – Léon Gambetta, 27 April 1915) was a French naval officer and admiral.

== Career ==
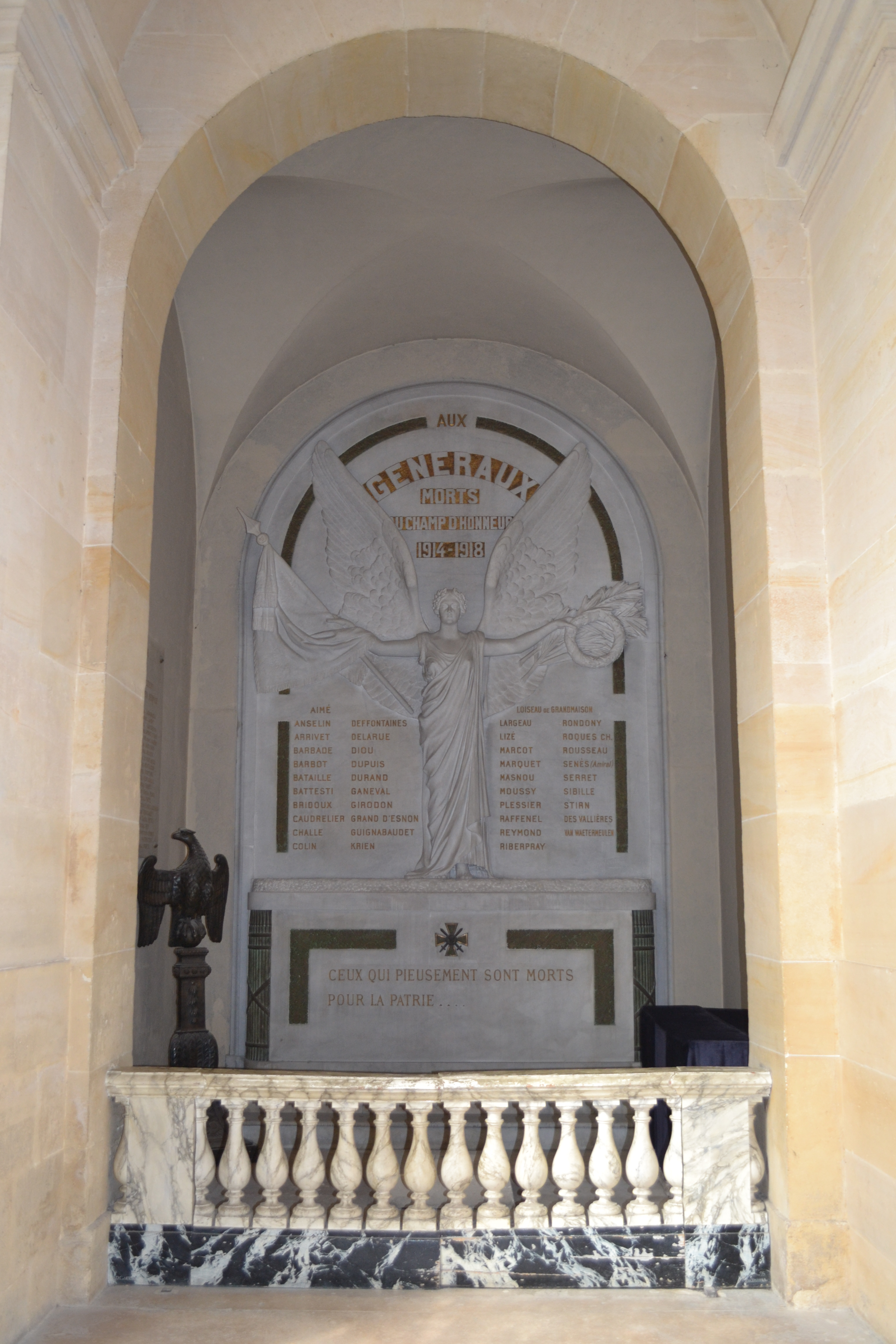
The Mémorial des Généraux 1914–1918 at the Les Invalides in Paris. Listed are 40 of the generals killed during World War I, as well as Admiral Senès.

Senès entered the École Navale in October 1874. He reached the rank of enseigne de vaisseau 2nd class in August 1876, and joined the battleship Richelieu. He reached the rank of enseigne de vaisseau first class the following year and was promoted in October 1879 to Lieutenant de vaisseau.

He served as Maneuvering Officer on Orne from 1881, and he participated in the campaign of Tunisia. Three years later, when in command of the ship's machine guns at Tonkin, he distinguished himself during operations in the River Claire (Sông Lô River, also called the Lo River).

Injured in February 1885, he was promoted to Lieutenant de vaisseau in March of that same year. He then headed the Secrétariat Général majority in Toulon in 1886, and later attended the School of Submarine Defence on the Algésiras.

Commissioned as a destroyer commander, he was finally ordered in 1890 to Destroyer Squadron 127 in the Mediterranean and, in 1891, took command of torpedo boat Éclair. In 1897, he took part in the operations of the International Squadron sent to Crete during the Christian uprising against rule by the Ottoman Empire there in 1897–1898.

He was promoted to Frigate captain in 1898, served as aide to the Ministry, and eventually rose to personal secretary of the Minister of War. He became chief of the first section of the General Staff in Toulon, and he was conspicuous in 1899 during the explosion of the powder magazine at La Goubran near Toulon. Senès became a captain in 1905 and took command of the battleship Charles Martel, in the Mediterranean Squadron.

He was promoted to Rear-Admiral in 1911, and took command of the 2nd Division of the 1st Light Wing, on the armoured cruiser Léon Gambetta. At the beginning of the First World War, he took part in cruiser operations in the Mediterranean and Adriatic. On 27 April 1915, the Léon Gambetta was torpedoed by the Austrian-Hungarian submarine U-5 off Cape Santa Maria di Leuca. Senès sank with his vessel.

== Sources ==
VICTOR BAPTISTIN SENES (1857–1915)
