= SS Lafayette (1914) =

French transatlantic liner

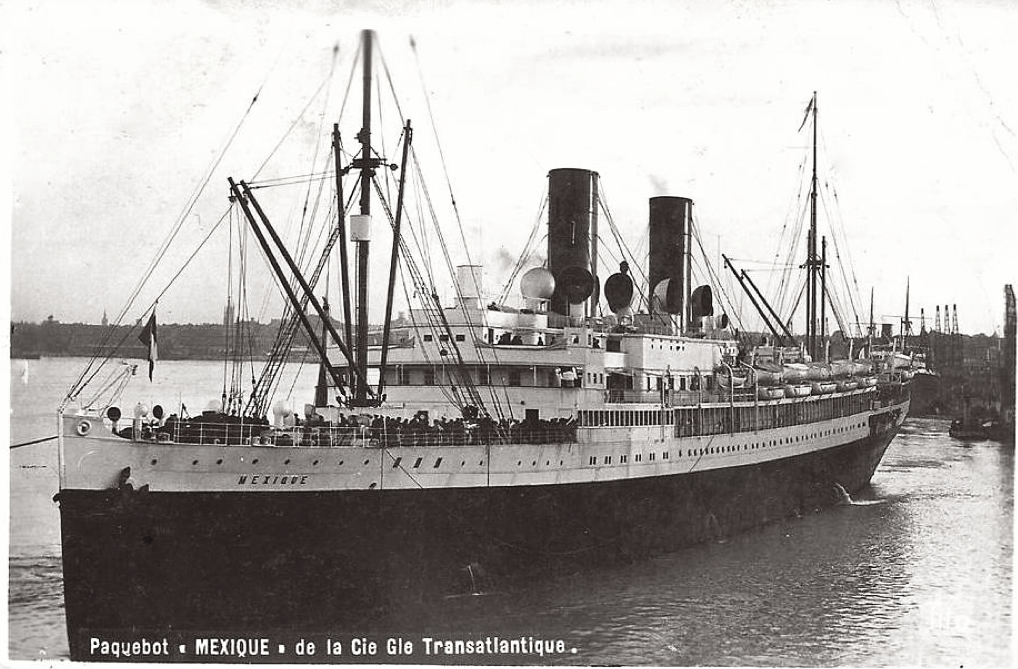
- Mexique in or after 1928

History

France
- Name: 1914: Île de Cuba; 1915: Lafayette; 1928: Mexique
- Namesake: 1914: Cuba; 1915: Marquis de Lafayette; 1928: Mexico
- Owner: Cie Générale Transatlantique
- Operator: 1915: Cie Gén Transatlantique; 1917: French Navy; 1919: Cie Gén Transatlantique; 1939: French Navy
- Port of registry: Saint-Nazaire
- Route: 1915: Bordeaux – New York; 1920: Le Havre – New York; 1928: France – Central America
- Builder: Chantiers et Ateliers de Provence
- Launched: 27 May 1914
- Completed: 3 June 1915
- In service: November 1915
- Refit: 1917, 1919, 1928
- Identification: code letters OKYN (until 1933); call sign FNSS (1934 onward); pennant number X22 (1939–40)
- Fate: Sunk by naval mine, 19 June 1940

General characteristics
- Type: Ocean liner
- Tonnage: 12,220 GRT; 6,087 NRT; 5,195 DWT
- Length: 547.5 ft (166.9 m)
- Beam: 64.2 ft (19.6 m)
- Depth: 34.8 ft (10.6 m)
- Decks: 4
- Propulsion: 4 × screws: 2 × compound steam engines; 2 × steam turbines
- Speed: 17 knots (31 km/h)
- Capacity: as hospital ship: 1,400 beds
- Sensors & processing systems: direction finding (by 1930); gyrocompass (by 1934)

SS Lafayette was a French transatlantic ocean liner of the Compagnie Générale Transatlantique (CGT). She was launched in 1914 as Île de Cuba but when she was completed in 1915 she was renamed Lafayette.

Lafayette was a hospital ship in the latter part of the First World War and a troop ship in 1919.

In 1928 CGT had Lafayette refitted and renamed her Mexique. In 1939 Mexique was converted into an auxiliary cruiser. In 1940 a mine sank her at the mouth of the Gironde.

This was the second of three CGT liners called Lafayette. The first was an iron-hulled paddle steamer built in 1864 and sold for scrap in 1906. The third was a motor ship built in 1929 and destroyed by fire in Le Havre in 1938.

== Île de Cuba ==
Chantiers et Ateliers de Provence built Île de Cuba at Port-de-Bouc, launching her on 27 May 1914. Like CGT's Rochambeau launched in 1911, and Flandre launched in 1913, she had four screws: two driven by reciprocating steam engines, two driven by low-pressure steam turbines, and exhaust steam from the reciprocating engines powered the turbines. Chantiers et Ateliers de Provence made the reciprocating engines, and Chantiers de l'Atlantique made the turbines.

But whereas Rochambeau had triple-expansion engines, Flandre and Île de Cuba each had four-cylinder compound engines. Île de Cuba had a top speed of 18.5 knots (34.3 km/h) and service speed of 17 knots (31 km/h).

CGT ordered Île de Cuba for its routes between Saint-Nazaire and the Antilles, Central America and Mexico. But when she was completed in June 1915 CGT reallocated her to its route between Bordeaux and New York City. To reflect her new route CGT renamed her Lafayette, after Gilbert du Motier, Marquis de Lafayette who was a general in the American Revolutionary War.

== Lafayette ==
Lafayette entered service between Bordeaux and New York in November 1915. A month later her passengers from Bordeaux to New York included William K Vanderbilt, Anne Harriman Vanderbilt, Mabelle Gilman Corey, Edith O'Shaughnessy, Elsie de Wolfe and Whitney Warren.

In January 1916 US nationals including Henry Clews Jr. who had booked to sail on Lafayette received anonymous letters warning them not to do so, as the Imperial German Navy would try to sink her. The letters were reported to be the same as that sent to Charles Frohman before he sailed on RMS Lusitania in May 1915.

On the night of 20–21 August 1916 Lafayette accidentally rammed and sank Drifter, a 35 ft (11 m) private sloop, in the Ambrose Channel. Visibility was clear, but Drifter's mainsail had obscured her starboard navigation light until Lafayette was too close to avoid her. A boat from Lafayette rescued Drifter's five crew from the water.

On 26 August 1916 Lafayette left New York carrying passengers including The New York Sun publisher Frank Munsey and retired United States Army surgeon Louis Livingston Seaman.

=== Hospital ship and troop ship ===
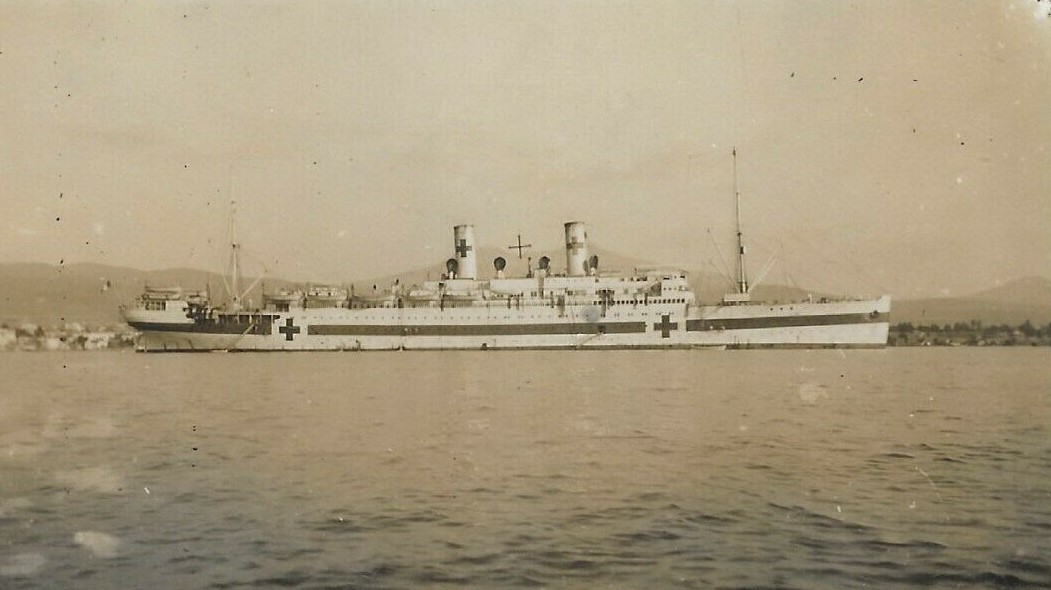
Lafayette as a hospital ship

In January 1917 the French government requisitioned Lafayette. On 13 February Ateliers et Chantiers de la Gironde à Bordeaux started to convert her into a 1,400-bed hospital ship. On 22 February the conversion was completed and she entered service with the French Navy.

On 28 March Lafayette left Le Verdon-sur-Mer for Algiers and Salonica. By the end of 1917 she had made ten voyages between Salonika and Toulon.

After the Armistice of 11 November 1918 Lafayette continued to serve as a hospital ship, but also served as a troop ship. On 16 January 1919 she was at the Hook of Holland to embark sick or wounded French prisoners of war and repatriate them to Le Havre. From the end of January she operated in the Mediterranean, calling at Ajaccio, Alexandretta, Bizerte, Corfu, Gravosa, Ragusa and Taranto.

=== Return to civilian service ===
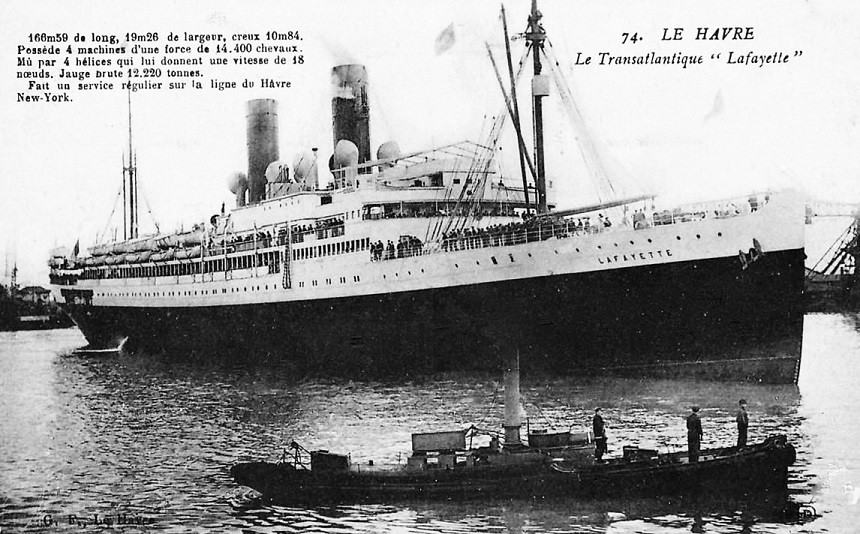
Lafayette in Le Havre before 1928

On 22 October 1919 Lafayette was returned to CGT, who had her refitted and returned her to service on its route between New York and Le Havre.

Lafayette carried gold bullion from the Bank of France to US banks as instalments of the repayment of France's war debt. In September 1920 she brought gold worth $10 million for payment to J.P. Morgan & Co. In October 1921 she brought gold worth $1,308,571 for payment to the Equitable Trust Company.

Lafayette spent the first four months of 1921 taking French and Spanish emigrants to Mexico and the West Indies.

Between 29 October and 6 November 1921 Lafayette made the fastest westbound crossing of her career thus far, reportedly achieving 19 knots (35 km/h). She was carrying the Prime Minister of France, Aristide Briand, who was on his way to head the French delegation to the Washington Naval Conference.

On 8 July 1922 Lafayette left Le Havre on a westbound crossing but that night was hit by a storm and heavy sea that tore off the hatch of her forward hold. Enough water entered the hold to force her to turn back to Le Havre. Furniture in her grand salon was also wrecked. CGT took her out of service to be dry docked in Saint-Nazaire for repairs. She was expected to be out of service for about three weeks.

In mid-Atlantic at 0130 hrs on 10 August 1922 the White Star liner RMS Adriatic suffered a gas explosion in her number three hold, which she was using as a reserve coal bunker. The explosion killed five crewmen, severely injured another three, tore the hatch off the hold and started a coal fire. Lafayette and the United States Lines liner Reliance changed course in response to Adriatic's distress message. Adriatic's crew fought and extinguished the fire. At 0355 hrs Adriatic's wireless operator signalled that there was no further danger, so Lafayette and Reliance resumed their normal courses.

=== Prohibition ===
In 1922, during the Prohibition era, US Attorney General Harry M. Daugherty declared that foreign-owned liners could not carry liquor in US territorial waters. Accordingly, on 14 October 1922 Lafayette left France for New York as a "dry ship", carrying no liquor for its passengers.

CGT objected to the ban, insisted that it was enough for a ship to seal its bars and stop serving liquor to passengers before it reached the USA's three-mile limit. The company said it would bring a test case in the US Supreme Court. If this did not go in the company's favour, CGT would appeal to the International Court of Justice in The Hague. The company said that the ban would cost it hundreds of thousands of francs per month. UK shipping companies were in a similar position on liquor sales and supported CGT's case.

In French merchant ships it was customary to issue each seaman or stoker a daily allowance of either a litre or half a litre of wine per person per day. The French Government warned that it would make representations if the USA tried to deprive French merchant seafarers of this "vested right". A CGT spokesman called wine "one of the primest necessities of life" for its crews and predicted that the company "would be unable to muster crews for New York should the edict be upheld".

== Mexique ==
In 1928 CGT had the ship thoroughly refitted, renamed her Mexique and transferred her to the routes to Mexico and Central America for which she had originally been built. CGT re-used the name Lafayette for a new 25,178 GRT motor ship that it had ordered for its route between Le Havre and New York, and which was launched in 1929.

In 1933 Mexique was converted from coal to oil fuel. Her navigational aids included wireless direction finding by 1930 and a gyrocompass by 1934. In 1934 her code letters OKYN were superseded by the call sign FNSS.

Between 1933 and 1935 Mexique occasionally served CGT's New York route, and also the route between Bordeaux and Casablanca. In 1936, the Mexique was used as a Mardi Gras cruise ship in the Gulf of Mexico and Caribbean Sea out of New Orleans. The Mexique did a cruise of Mexico City, Veracruz, Cristobal, Kingston, and Havana from Feb 26, 1936 to Mar 17, 1936. where notable jazz musician Ellis Stratakos performed. In 1939 Mexique was taken out of service, but then returned to service to make two voyages carrying Spanish Republican refugees to Mexico.

In September 1939, when the Second World War began, the French government requisitioned Mexique as an auxiliary cruiser. She was commissioned with the pennant number X22. She seems then to have been returned to her owners, possibly on 17 November 1939. But in April 1940 she was requisitioned again as an auxiliary cruiser. She took part in the Norwegian campaign as a troop ship.

During the Battle of France on 2 June Mexique was in Marseille, and her anti-aircraft guns took part in the defence of the port against a German air raid. On 19 June she arrived in the Gironde estuary to evacuate members of the National Assembly and take them to French North Africa. A German mine sank her off Le-Verdon-Sur-Mer, but without loss of life.

== Bibliography ==
- Dufeil, Yves; le Bel, Franck; Terraillon, Marc (2008). Navire hôpital; Transport de troupes Lafayette (PDF) (in French). Marine Nationale.
- Harnack, Edwin P (1930) [1903]. All About Ships & Shipping (3rd ed.). London: Faber and Faber.
- Neveu, Philippe (2015). Lot No 91 (PDF). Vent aux encheres publiques du 22 Juin 2015 (in French and English). Rennes Encheres.
- Wilson, RM (1956). The Big Ships. London: Cassell & Co.

Media related to Lafayette (ship, 1914) at Wikimedia Commons
