= SS Principe Umberto =

Italian cargo ship

History
- Name: SS Principe Umberto
- Namesake: Prince Umberto
- Owner: Navigazione Generale Italiana
- Port of registry: Genoa
- Builder: Cantieri Navali del Tirreno, Palermo
- Yard number: 13
- Laid down: 40.4361°N 19.2975°E
- Completed: April 1909
- Fate: Sunk, 8 June 1916

General characteristics
- Tonnage: 7,838 GRT
- Length: 145.1 m (476 ft 1 in) (pp)
- Beam: 16.3 m (53 ft 6 in)
- Propulsion: 2 × quadruple expansion steam engines
- Speed: 16 knots (30 km/h)

SS Principe Umberto was an Italian passenger and refrigerated cargo ship built in 1908 for Navigazione Generale Italiana. During World War I, Principe Umberto served as an armed merchant cruiser.

While transporting troops in the Adriatic in June 1916, the ship was sunk by Austro-Hungarian U-boat U-5 with the loss of 1,926 men. It was the worst naval disaster of World War I in terms of human lives lost.

== Career ==
Principe Umberto was built in 1908 by the Cantieri Navali del Tirreno in Palermo for the Navigazione Generale Italiana a company that sailed to Mediterranean and Black Sea ports, as well as passenger service to North and South America.

She was 145.1 meters (476 ft 1 in) long (pp) with a beam of 16.3 meters (53 ft 6 in). She was powered by two quadruple expansion steam engines that moved her at up to 16 knots (30 km/h).

Principe Umberto's routes and early activities are not known, but during World War I, the ship was employed as an armed merchant cruiser to transport men and materiel in support of Italy.

On 8 June 1916, Principe Umberto and another transport, the Ravenna, were carrying the 55th Infantry Regiment (col. Ernesto Piano) back from Albania to Italy, under the escort of the Italian scout cruiser Libia and four Regia Marina destroyers. The Austro-Hungarian U-boat U-5, under the command of Friedrich Schlosser, launched a torpedo attack that successfully hit the Italian ship. Principe Umberto went down quickly with the loss of 1,926 men (1,750 according to other sources). The sinking resulted in the greatest loss of life in any submarine attack in World War I.

The wreck was discovered in May 2022 off the coast of Albania near Cape of Gjuhez using an underwater robot by the Swiss-Italian engineer Guido Gay.

== See also ==
- List by death toll of ships sunk by submarines

== Bibliography ==
- Rider, Fremont, ed. (1917). Information Annual 1916: A Continuous Cyclopedia and Digest of Current Events. New York: Cumulative Digest Corporation. OCLC 67878688.
- Sieche, Erwin F. (1980). "Austro-Hungarian Submarines". Warship, Volume 2. Naval Institute Press. ISBN 978-0-87021-976-4. OCLC 233144055.
