= French cruiser Léon Gambetta =

French Navy's Léon Gambetta-class cruiser

Léon Gambetta
- Léon Gambetta underway

History

France
- Name: Léon Gambetta
- Namesake: Léon Gambetta
- Ordered: 2 July 1900
- Builder: Arsenal de Brest
- Cost: 29,248,500FF
- Laid down: 15 January 1901
- Launched: 26 October 1902
- Commissioned: 21 July 1905
- Fate: Sunk 27 April 1915

General characteristics
- Class & type: Léon Gambetta-class armoured cruiser
- Displacement: 12,550 t (12,352 long tons)
- Length: 148.35 m (486 ft 9 in) (o/a)
- Beam: 21.4 m (70 ft 3 in)
- Draft: 8.18 m (26 ft 10 in)
- Installed power: 28 Niclausse boilers; 27,500 PS (20,226 kW)
- Propulsion: 3 shafts; 3 triple-expansion steam engines
- Speed: 22 knots (41 km/h; 25 mph)
- Range: 7,500 nmi (13,900 km; 8,600 mi) at 10 knots (19 km/h; 12 mph)
- Complement: 734; 779 as a flagship
- Armament: 2 × twin 194 mm (7.6 in) guns; 6 × twin, 4 × single 164 mm (6.5 in) guns; 24 × single 47 mm (1.9 in) Hotchkiss guns; 5 × 450 mm (17.7 in) torpedo tubes; 10 naval mines
- Armor: Waterline belt: 80–150 mm (3.1–5.9 in); Deck: 33–65 mm (1.3–2.6 in); Main-gun turrets: 138 mm (5.4 in); Conning tower: 174 mm (6.9 in)

Léon Gambetta was the lead ship of her class of three armored cruisers built for the French Navy (Marine Nationale) in the first decade of the 20th century. Armed with four 194-millimeter (7.6 in) guns, the ships were much larger and more powerfully armed than their predecessors. Completed in 1905, she was initially assigned to the Northern Squadron (Escadre du Nord) where she served as a flagship. The ship was transferred to the Mediterranean Squadron (Escadre de la Méditerranée) in 1910 and remained there for the rest of her career.

During World War I, Léon Gambetta escorted convoys as well as the capital ships of the French fleet. She participated in the blockade of the Austro-Hungarian Navy in the Adriatic Sea. The ship was sunk by the Austro-Hungarian U-boat U-5 in April 1915 with heavy loss of life.

== Description ==
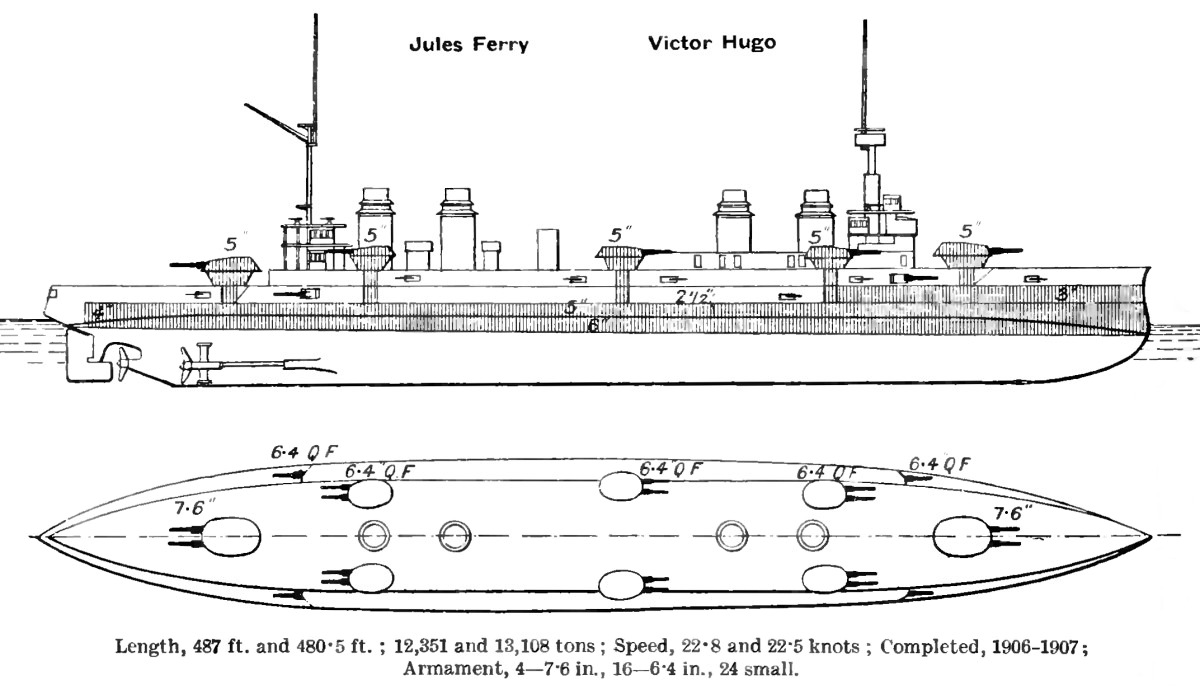
Right elevation and deck plan as depicted in Brassey's Naval Annual 1923

The Léon Gambetta-class ships were designed as enlarged and more powerful versions of the Gloire-class armored cruisers. The first two ships (Léon Gambetta and Jules Ferry) measured 148.35 meters (486 ft 9 in) overall, with a beam of 21.4 meters (70 ft 3 in) and a draft of 8.18 meters (26 ft 10 in). All three sister ships were designed to displace 12,550 metric tons (12,350 long tons) at normal load. Their crew normally numbered 26 officers and 708 enlisted men, or 30 officers and 749 men when serving as a flagship.

The ships had three vertical triple-expansion steam engines, each driving one propeller shaft. Each of the sisters used a different type of water-tube boiler and Léon Gambetta was fitted with 28 Niclausse boilers. Their engines were rated at a total of 27,500 metric horsepower (20,200 kW) to reach their designed maximum speed of 22 knots (41 km/h; 25 mph); during her sea trials on 22 April 1905, Léon Gambetta reached 23 knots (43 km/h; 26 mph) from 29,029 metric horsepower (21,351 kW). The cruisers carried enough coal to give them a range of 7,500 nautical miles (13,900 km; 8,600 mi) at a speed of 10 knots (19 km/h; 12 mph).

The main battery of the Léon Gambetta class consisted of four 194-millimeter Modèle 1893–1896 guns mounted in twin-gun turrets fore and aft of the superstructure. Their secondary armament comprised sixteen 164-millimeter (6.5 in) Modèle 1893–1896M guns. Twelve of these were in three twin-gun turrets on each broadside and the remaining four guns were in casemates in the hull. For defense against torpedo boats, they carried twenty-four 47-millimeter (1.9 in) Hotchkiss guns. Léon Gambetta was also armed with five 450-millimeter (17.7 in) torpedo tubes. One pair was submerged and the other pair was above water, both firing on the broadside; the last tube was above water in the stern. The ship could carry 10 naval mines.

The cruisers' waterline armor belt ranged in thickness from 80 to 150 millimeters (3.1 to 5.9 in) and the main-gun turrets were protected by armor 138 millimeters (5.4 in) thick. Their deck armor was 33 to 65 mm (1.3 to 2.6 in) thick. The front and sides of the conning tower consisted of 174-millimeter (6.9 in) armor plates.

== Construction and career ==
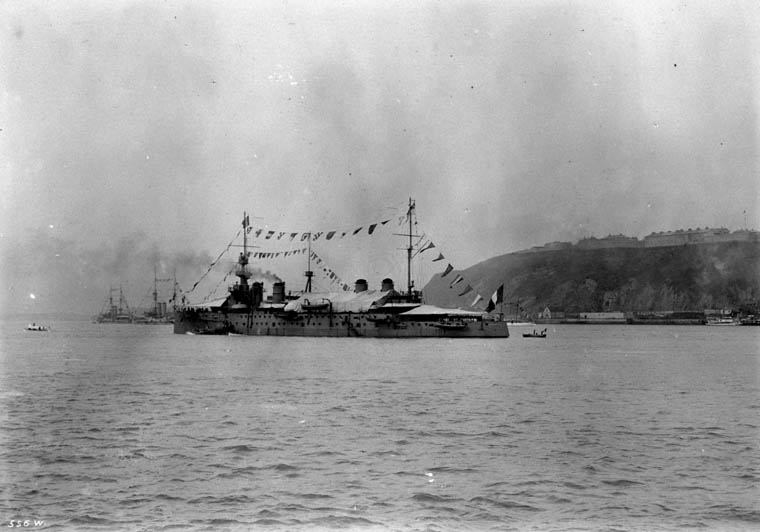
Léon Gambetta at the Quebec Tercentenary, July 1908

Minister of the Navy Jean Marie Antoine de Lanessan ordered the Arsenal de Brest to begin work on the ship, named after former French Prime Minister Léon Gambetta, on 2 July 1900 in compliance with the recently passed Naval Law (Statut Naval). She was laid down on 15 January 1901, launched on 26 October 1902, and began her preliminary sea trials on 1 December 1903. The cruiser ran aground in fog while conducting trials in late February 1904; two of her propellers and a large amount of hull plating had to be replaced. After resuming her trials in August, the cruiser briefly went aground again while trying to navigate the narrow entrance to the River Penfeld in early September. One of her bilge keels was damaged and the blades of her propellers were bent. Léon Gambetta finally began her official sea trials in April 1905 and was commissioned (armement définitif) on 21 July. Her construction cost 29,248,500 francs.

The ship was assigned to the Northern Squadron and became the flagship of the 1st Cruiser Squadron (1^{re} Division de croiseur) under the command of Vice Admiral (Vice-amiral) Camille Gigon. Léon Gambetta participated in the Northern Squadron's visit to Portsmouth the following month to commemorate the signing of the Entente Cordiale allying France and Britain. Vice Admiral Horace Jauréguiberry had assumed command of the squadron by October when she ferried Émile Loubet, President of France, home from a state visit in Lisbon, Portugal. In May 1908 The ship transported Armand Fallières, who succeeded Loubet as President, to Dover, England, and in July participated in the Quebec Tercentenary in Canada. Jauréguiberry remained in command of the division through July 1909.

On 5 October 1909, the French Navy reorganized its forces and redesignated the Northern Squadron as the 2nd Squadron (2^{e} Escadre) and the 1st Cruiser Squadron became the 1st Light Division (1^{re} Division légère (DL)). In January 1910 Léon Gambetta was transferred to the Mediterranean where she was assigned to the 1st DL of the 1st Squadron (1^{re} Escadre). The 1st DL was redesignated as the 2nd DL in August and a new 1st DL was formed with Léon Gambetta as its flagship in October. By 4 April 1911, the 1st DL consisted of all three sisters with Léon Gambetta serving as the flagship of Rear Admiral (Contre-amiral) Louis Dartige du Fournet. The ship was transferred to the 1st DL by 4 September and participated in the fleet review by Fallières off Toulon that day. The 2nd DL was reformed on 10 February 1912 with all three sisters assigned; Léon Gambetta became the divisional flagship.

=== World War I ===
When Imperial Germany declared war on France on 3 August 1914, the ship was the flagship of Rear Admiral Victor-Baptistin Senès. The following day the 2nd DL was part of the escorting force for a troop convoy from Algiers, French Algeria to Metropolitan France. On 13 August Vice Admiral Augustin Boué de Lapeyrère, commander of the Allied forces in the Central Mediterranean, was ordered to begin offensive operations against the Austro-Hungarian fleet in the Adriatic. He decided to break the Austro-Hungarian blockade of the port of Antivari, Montenegro, and to engage any ships operating out of nearby Cattaro. He split his available forces into two groups with the armored cruisers following the Albanian coast and the battleships tracing the Italian coast before cutting across the Adriatic to rendezvous at Antivari on the morning of the 16th. The latter sank the protected cruiser SMS Zenta that morning in the Battle of Antivari as the armored cruisers were coming up from the south.

At the end of the month, the French began intermittently escorting single cargo ships to Antivari, usually escorted by the armored cruisers and covered by the main battlefleet. The first of these was on 31 September when four armored cruisers escorted the steamer SS Liamone while the battleships bombarded the defenses of Cattaro. The 2nd DL escorted the cargo ship SS Henri Fraissinet as it brought long-range artillery pieces to Antivari on 18–19 September. On the return voyage, they took advantage of the fog to bombard Cattaro before they were forced to withdraw by the heavy return fire. The 2nd DL participated in the next sortie into the Adriatic on 17 October, but it was uneventful. During the following mission, begun at the end of October, the 2nd DL raided the island of Lastovo on 2 November and Jules Ferry was narrowly missed by U-5, an Austro-Hungarian U-boat, on the return voyage the following day. The torpedoing of the dreadnought battleship Jean Bart on 21 December brought an end to the sorties into the Adriatic by the battlefleet; henceforth the supply ships were escorted by the armored cruisers or smaller ships. The French also responded by moving their patrol line further south to a line north of the Greek island of Corfu.

On 10 January 1915 Boué de Lapeyrère was informed that the Austro-Hungarian battlefleet was headed south; he put to sea with Léon Gambetta and the armored cruisers Ernest Renan, Waldeck-Rousseau and Jules Michelet patrolling off Corfu while the battleships cruised further south. This proved to be a false alarm. On 24 January Léon Gambetta ferried the Montenegrin Foreign Minister to the port of Medua, Albania, with a cargo of clothing and shoes for the Montenegrin Army, but it proved impossible to unload the cargo and the cruiser returned with it still aboard. There was another false alarm on 4 April, during which U-5 had spotted the cruiser off the island of Paxos, but was not able to maneuver into an attack position; the submarine was not spotted by the French ship. Léon Gambetta escorted the French freighter SS Whitehead to Medua on 5 April.

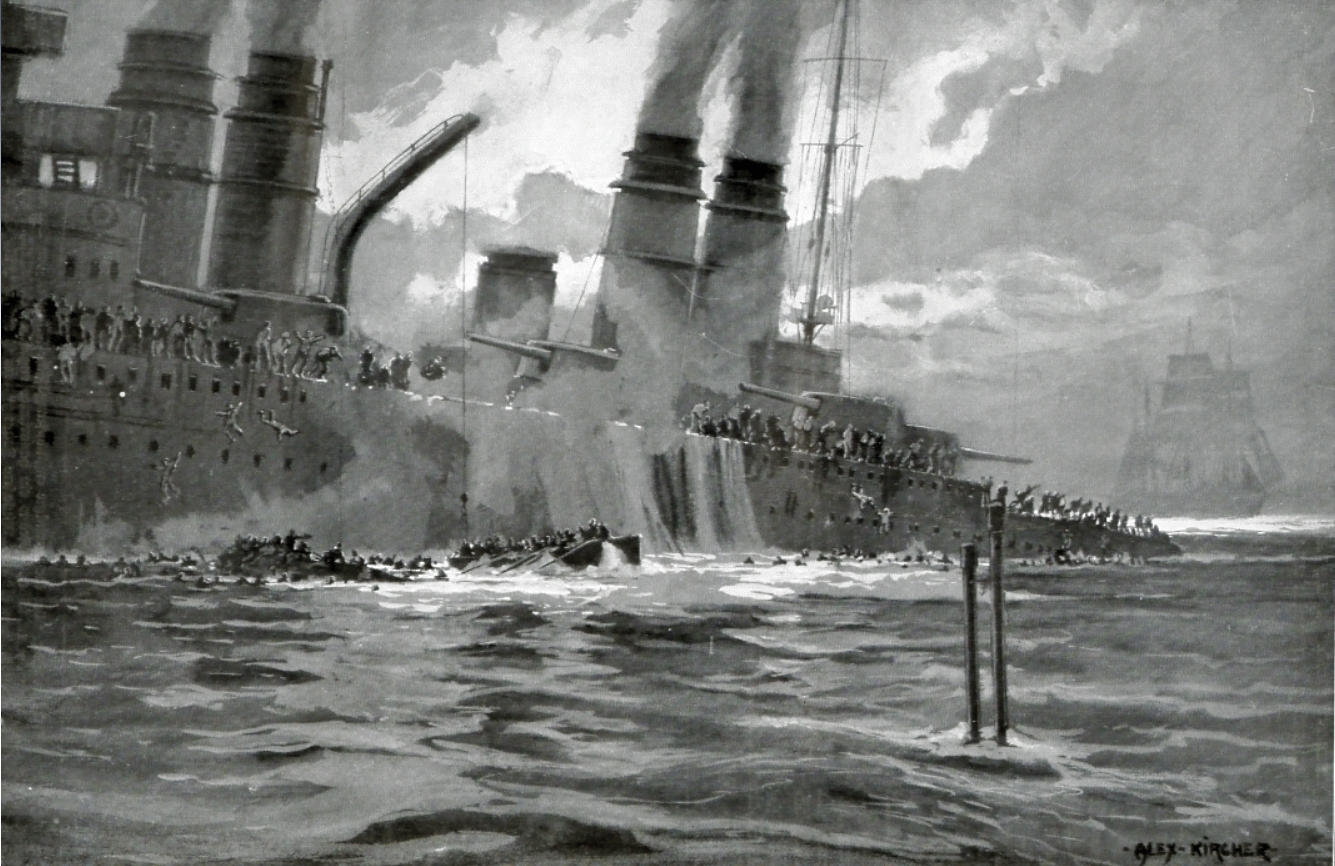
A German postcard with an artist's depiction of the sinking of Léon Gambetta

Italy signed the Treaty of London on 26 April, agreeing to declare war on Austria-Hungary. Boué de Lapeyrère, concerned about a possible pre-emptive attack on the southern Italian ports, temporarily moved all of his armored cruisers closer to the Strait of Otranto that day. Unbeknownst to Léon Gambetta, she had been stalked for a day and a half by Korvettenkapitän (Lieutenant Commander) Georg Ritter von Trapp, the new commander of U-5, when the submarine was finally able to make her attack at 00:40 on 27 April, roughly 15 nautical miles (28 km; 17 mi) south of Santa Maria di Leuca (the south-eastern tip of Italy in the Ionian Sea).

==== Sinking ====
Von Trapp fired two torpedoes at a range of 500 meters (550 yd), both of which struck the cruiser. One of them detonated abreast the dynamo room and the other against the forward boiler room, which contained the only boilers that were operating. The explosions immediately knocked out all power and Léon Gambetta took on a 15-degree list. The loss of steam prevented the use of the ship's pumps and hindered the ability to lower the lifeboats. Only two could be lowered in the 10 minutes before the cruiser capsized and sank. One of the lifeboats subsequently sank due to overcrowding; only 137 men out of her crew of 821 were rescued by the Italian destroyers Impavido and Indomito and two torpedo boats. The casualties included Senès and all of the ship's officers.

After the sinking, Boué de Lapeyrère withdrew his armored cruisers even further south to a patrol line running through the Gerogombos lighthouse on the island of Cephalonia. He also ordered that patrols should be made at a speed of 14 knots (26 km/h; 16 mph), not the leisurely 6 knots (11 km/h; 6.9 mph) used by Léon Gambetta's late captain.

== See also ==
- List by death toll of ships sunk by submarines

== Bibliography ==
- Chesneau, Roger & Kolesnik, Eugene M., eds. (1979). Conway's All the World's Fighting Ships 1860–1905. New York: Mayflower Books. ISBN 0-8317-0302-4.
- Freivogel, Zvonimir (2019). The Great War in the Adriatic Sea 1914–1918. Zagreb: Despot Infinitus. ISBN 978-953-8218-40-8.
- Halpern, Paul G. (2004). The Battle of the Otranto Straits: Controlling the Gateway to the Adriatic in World War I. Bloomington, Indiana: Indiana University Press. ISBN 0-253-34379-8.
- Jordan, John & Caresse, Philippe (2019). French Armoured Cruisers 1887–1932. Barnsley, UK: Seaforth Publishing. ISBN 978-1-5267-4118-9.
- Silverstone, Paul H. (1984). Directory of the World's Capital Ships. New York: Hippocrene Books. ISBN 0-88254-979-0.
