= SM U-5 (Austria-Hungary) =

Austro-Hungarian lead boat of U-5 class

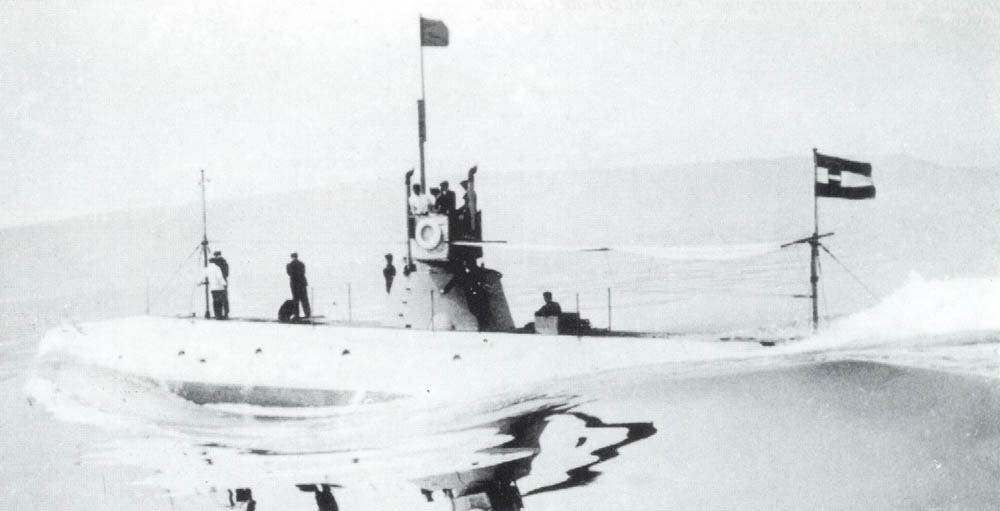
- U-5, at the trials

History

Austria-Hungary
- Name: SM U-5
- Ordered: 1906
- Builder: Whitehead & Co., Fiume
- Laid down: 9 April 1907
- Launched: 10 February 1909
- Sponsored by: Agathe Whitehead
- Commissioned: 1 April 1910
- Fate: Ceded to Italy as war reparation and scrapped, 1920

Service record
- Commanders: Urban Passerar; 1 April 1910 – 5 September 1912; Lüdwig Eberhardt; 5 September 1912 – 8 June 1914; Friedrich Schlosser; 8 June 1914 – 22 April 1915; Georg Ritter von Trapp; 22 April – 10 October 1915; Lüdwig Eberhardt; 10 October – 23 November 1915; Friedrich Schlosser; 23 November 1915 – 15 July 1917; Alfons Graf Montecuccoli; 27 August – 31 October 1918
- Victories: 2 warships sunk (12,641 tons); 1 auxiliary warship sunk (7,929 GRT); 1 merchant ship taken as prize (1,034 GRT)

General characteristics
- Class & type: U-5-class submarine
- Displacement: 240 t surfaced; 273 t submerged
- Length: 105 ft 4 in (32.11 m)
- Beam: 13 ft 9 in (4.19 m)
- Draft: 12 ft 10 in (3.91 m)
- Propulsion: 2 × shafts; 2 × 6-cylinder gasoline engines, 500 bhp (370 kW) total; 2 × electric motors, 230 shp (170 kW) total
- Speed: 10.75 knots (19.91 km/h) surfaced; 8.5 knots (15.7 km/h) submerged
- Range: 800 nmi (1,500 km) at 8.5 knots (15.7 km/h) surfaced; 48 nmi (89 km) at 6 knots (11.1 km/h) submerged
- Complement: 19
- Armament: 2 × 45 cm (17.7 in) torpedo tubes (both in front); 4 torpedoes

SM U-5 or U-V was the lead boat of the U-5 class of submarines or U-boats built for and operated by the Austro-Hungarian Navy (German: Kaiserliche und Königliche Kriegsmarine, K.u.K. Kriegsmarine) before and during the First World War. The submarine was built as part of a plan to evaluate foreign submarine designs, and was the first of the three boats of the class built by Whitehead & Co. of Fiume after a design by Irishman John Philip Holland.

U-5 was laid down in April 1907 and launched in February 1909. The single-hulled submarine was just over 105 feet (32 m) long and displaced between 240 and 273 metric tons (265 and 301 short tons), depending on whether surfaced or submerged. U-5's design had inadequate ventilation and exhaust from her twin gasoline engines often intoxicated the crew. The boat was commissioned into the Austro-Hungarian Navy in April 1910, and served as a training boat—sometimes making as many as ten cruises a month—through the beginning of the First World War in 1914.

The submarine scored most of her wartime successes during the first year of the war while under the command of Georg Ritter von Trapp. The French armoured cruiser Léon Gambetta, sunk in April 1915, was the largest ship sunk by U-5. The sinking of Italian troop transport ship SS Principe Umberto in June 1916 with the loss of 1,926 men, was the worst naval disaster of World War I in terms of human lives lost. In May 1917, U-5 hit a mine and sank with the loss of six men. She was raised, rebuilt, and recommissioned, but sank no more ships. At the end of the war, U-5 was ceded to Italy as a war reparation, and scrapped in 1920. In all, U-5 sank three ships totaling 7,929 gross register tons (GRT) and 12,641 tons.

== Design and construction ==
U-5 was built as part of a plan by the Austro-Hungarian Navy to competitively evaluate foreign submarine designs from Simon Lake, Germaniawerft, and John Philip Holland. The Austro-Hungarian Navy authorized the construction of U-5 (and sister ship, U-6) in 1906 by Whitehead & Co. of Fiume. The boat was designed by American John Philip Holland and licensed by Holland and his company, Electric Boat. U-5 was laid down on 9 April 1907 in the United States, partially assembled, and shipped to Whitehead's for final assembly, a process which, author Edwin Sieche notes, "caused a lot of trouble". She was launched at Fiume on 10 February 1909 by Agathe Whitehead, (Note: Agathe Whitehead, the granddaughter of Robert Whitehead, first met her future husband, Georg Ritter von Trapp, at the launching ceremony; von Trapp later became U-5's most successful commander. See: Berkowitz, p. 82, note 1.) and towed to Pola on 17 August.

U-5's design featured a single-hull with a teardrop-shaped body that bore a strong resemblance to modern nuclear submarines. She was 105 feet 4 inches (32.11 m) long by 13 feet 9 inches (4.19 m) abeam and had a draft of 12 feet 10 inches (3.91 m). She displaced 240 metric tons (260 short tons) surfaced, and 273 metric tons (301 short tons) submerged. Her two 45-centimeter (17.7 in) bow torpedo tubes featured unique, cloverleaf-shaped design hatches that rotated on a central axis, and the boat was designed to carry up to four torpedoes. For surface running, U-5 was outfitted with 2 gasoline engines, but suffered from inadequate ventilation, which resulted in frequent intoxication of the crew; her underwater propulsion was by two electric motors. The U-5 was christened by Agathe Whitehead on 10 February 1909.

== Service career ==
=== Urban Passerar ===
U-5 was commissioned into the Austro-Hungarian Navy on 1 April 1910, with Linienschiffsleutnant Urban Passerar in command. Over the next three years she served primarily as a training boat, making as many as ten training cruises per month. On 1 May 1911, she hosted a delegation of Peruvian Navy officers that inspected her. In June 1912, she towed a balloon as part of efforts to assess the underwater visibility of hull paint schemes.

At the outbreak of World War I, U-5 was one of only four fully operational U-boats in the Austro-Hungarian Navy fleet. She was initially stationed at the submarine base on Brioni, but was moved to Cattaro by late 1914. U-5 made an unsuccessful attack on a French battleship squadron off Punta Stilo on 3 November. In December, the ship's armament was augmented by a 3.7 cm/23 (1.5 in) quick-firing (QF) deck gun, and had her first radio receiver installed.

=== Georg Ritter von Trapp ===
In April 1915, Georg Ritter von Trapp assumed command of U-5, and the following month, led the boat in sinking the French armored cruiser Léon Gambetta off Santa Maria di Leuca. On the night of 26 April, Léon Gambetta was patrolling the Straits of Otranto at a leisurely 6.5 knots (12.0 km/h) without the benefit of a destroyer screen. U-5 launched two torpedoes at the French cruiser, hitting with both. The ship was rocked by the explosions of the two torpedoes and went down in ten minutes, taking down with her the entire complement of officers, including Rear Admiral Victor Baptistin Sénès. Of the French ship's complement, 648 were killed in the attack; there were 137 survivors. Léon Gambetta was the largest ship of any kind sunk by U-5.

In June, U-5 helped search for the lost Austro-Hungarian seaplane L 41, and in July, received an upgrade of her deck gun to a 4.7 cm (1.9 in) QF gun. In early August, U-5 was sent out from Lissa when the Austro-Hungarian Navy received word from a reconnaissance aircraft that an Italian submarine had been sighted at Pelagosa. On the morning of 5 August, the Italian submarine Nereide was on the surface, moored under a cliff in the island's harbor. When U-5 surfaced just offshore, Nereide's commanding officer, Capitano di Corvetta Carlo del Greco, cast off the lines and maneuvered to get a shot at von Trapp's boat. Nereide launched a single torpedo at U-5 that missed, after which del Greco ordered his boat submerged. U-5 lined up a shot and launched a single torpedo at the slowly submerging target, striking her, and sending her to the bottom with all hands. (Note: Stern (p. 40) reports 20 men were killed when Nereide went down; Sieche (p. 22) reports a loss of 17.) The Italian captain received the Medaglia d'Oro al Valore Militare for his actions. At the end of August, U-5 captured the 1,034 GRT Greek steamer Cefalonia as a prize off Durazzo.

=== Friedrich Schlosser ===
In late November, Friedrich Schlosser succeeded von Trapp as U-5's commanding officer.

Schlosser and U-5 made an unsuccessful attack on an Italian Indomito-class destroyer on 7 June 1916, but the boat managed to torpedo the Italian armed merchant cruiser Principe Umberto off Cape Linguetta on the next day. According to a contemporary account, Principe Umberto and two other ships were transporting troops and materiel under escort of two destroyers. After the torpedo hit, Principe Umberto went down quickly with the loss 1,750 men. Principe Umberto was the last ship hit by U-5.

On 16 May 1917, U-5 was conducting a training cruise in the Fasana Channel near Pula when her stern struck a mine. The boat sank at a depth of 36 meters (118 ft) with a loss of six of the 19 men on board. From 20 to 24 May the submarine was raised, and through November underwent a refit. During this reconditioning, a new conning tower was added and the deck gun was upgraded again, this time to a 7.5 cm/30 (3.0 in) gun. Upon completion, U-5 was recommissioned, but had no more war successes. In her career, U-5 sank a total of three ships totaling 7,929 GRT and 12,641 tons. After the war's end, U-5 was transferred to Venice where she was inspected by British military commissions. U-5 was later ceded to Italy as a war reparation in 1920 and was scrapped.

== Summary of raiding history ==
Date	Name	Nationality	Tonnage (Note: Merchant ship tonnages are in gross register tons. Military vessels are listed by tons displacement.)	Fate
27 April 1915	Léon Gambetta	French Navy	12,416	Sunk
5 August 1915	Nereide	Regia Marina	225	Sunk
29 August 1915	Cefalonia	Greece	1,034	Captured as prize
8 June 1916	Principe Umberto	Regia Marina	7,929	Sunk

== Gallery ==
seen in a pre-war postcard

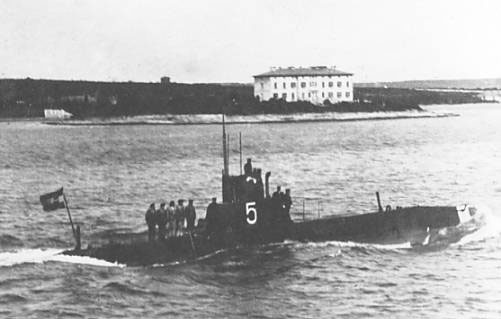
SMU-5 passing Brioni island at the beginning of WW-I

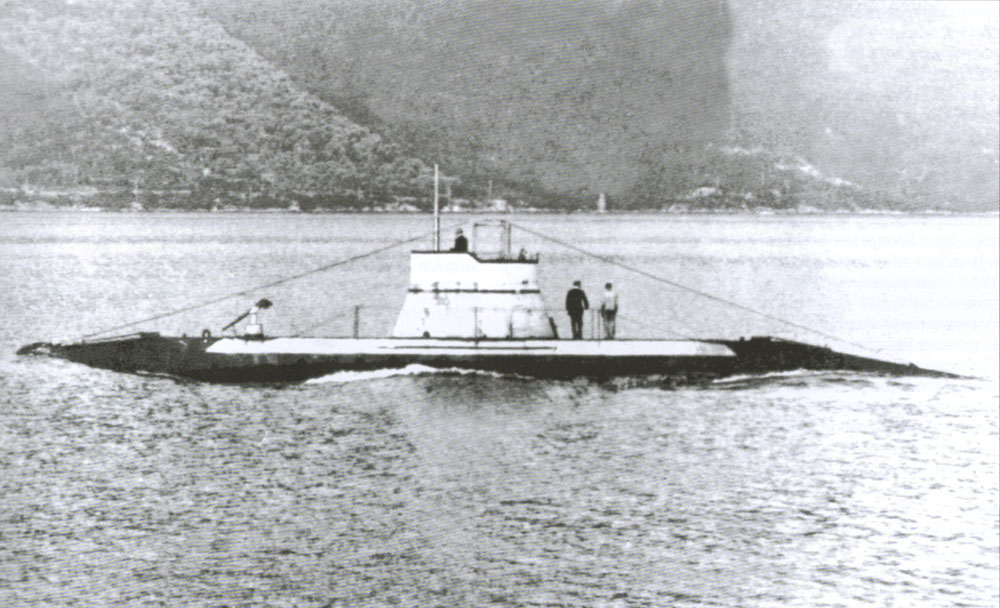
SMU-5 with new deckgun in 1915

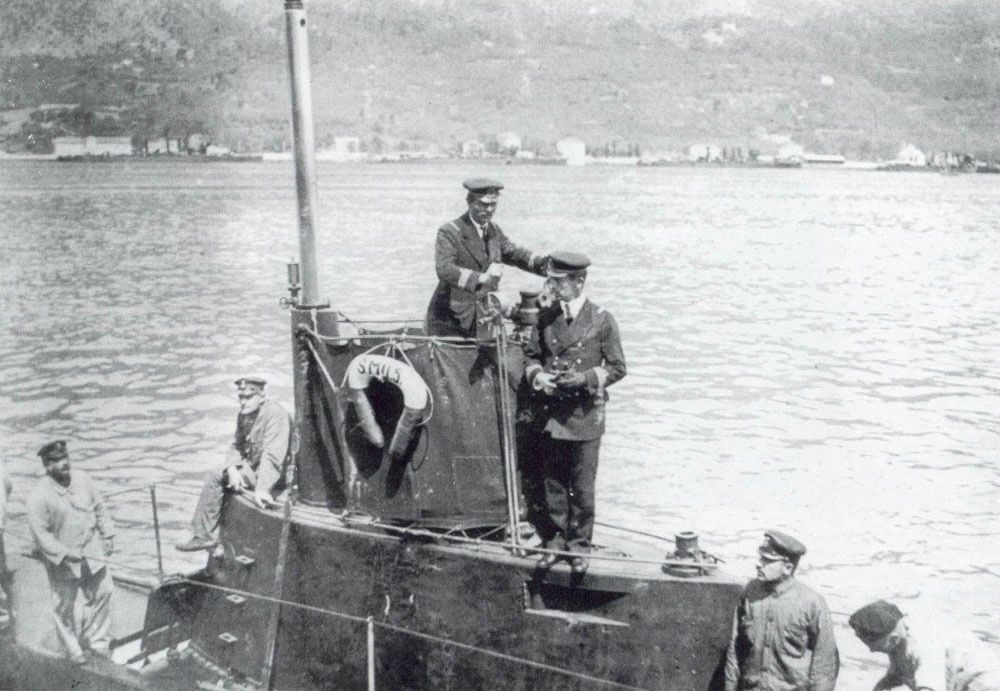
Georg Ritter von Trapp on the bridge

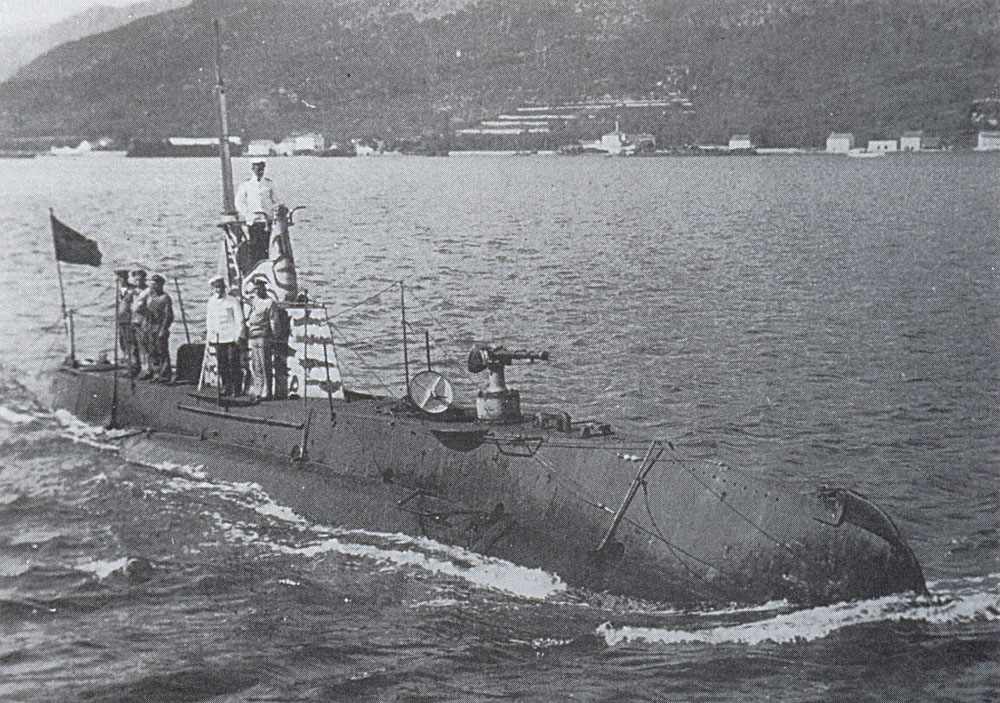
SMU-5 in Kotor harbor

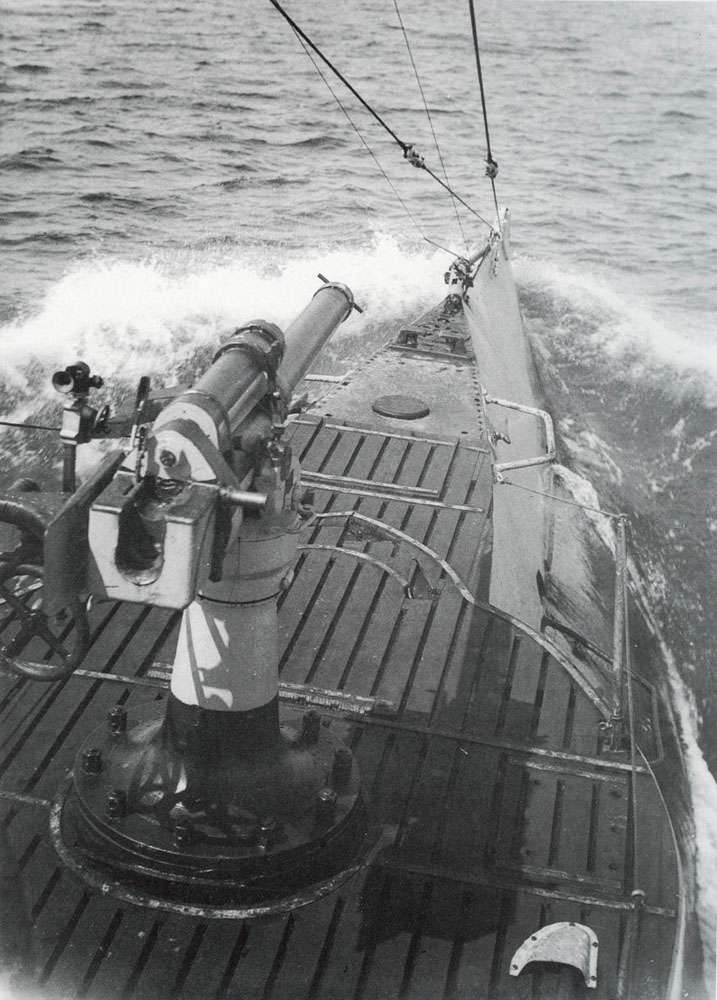
75mm deckgun

=== Victims gallery ===
U-5 sank the French cruiser Léon Gambetta in April 1915 with heavy loss of life.

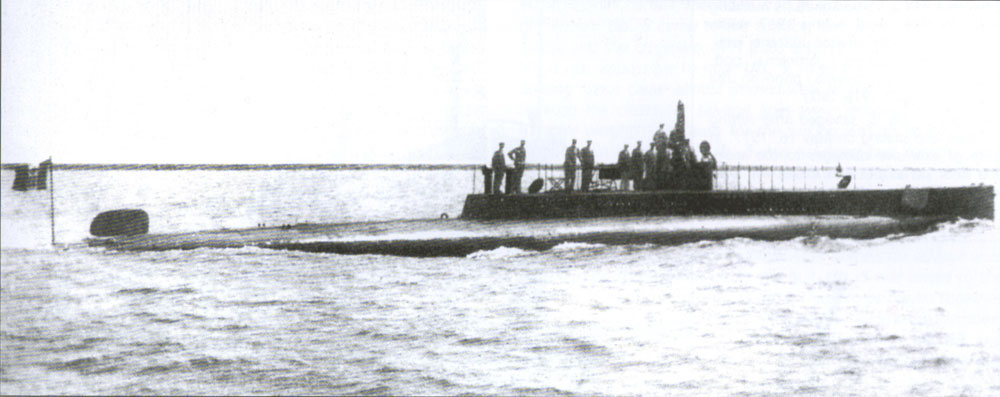
Italian submarine Nereide

== Bibliography ==
- Berkowitz, Bruce D. (2003). The New Face of War: How War Will Be Fought in the 21st Century. New York: Free Press. ISBN 978-0-7432-1249-6. OCLC 51559019.
- Gardiner, Robert; Gray, Randal, eds. (1985). Conway's All the World's Fighting Ships 1906–1921. Annapolis, Maryland: Naval Institute Press. ISBN 978-0-87021-907-8. OCLC 12119866.
- Gibson, R. H.; Prendergast, Maurice (2003) [1931]. The German Submarine War, 1914–1918. Annapolis, Maryland: Naval Institute Press. ISBN 978-1-59114-314-7. OCLC 52924732.
- Grant, Robert M. (2002) [1964]. U-boats Destroyed: The Effect of Anti-submarine Warfare, 1914–1918. Penzance: Periscope. ISBN 978-1-904381-00-6. OCLC 50215640.
- Halpern, Paul G. (1994). A Naval History of World War I. Annapolis, Maryland: Naval Institute Press. ISBN 978-1-55750-352-7. OCLC 57447525.
- Rider, Fremont, ed. (1917). Information Annual 1916: A Continuous Cyclopedia and Digest of Current Events. New York: Cumulative Digest Corporation. OCLC 67878688.
- Sieche, Erwin F. (1980). "Austro-Hungarian Submarines". Warship, Volume 2. Naval Institute Press. ISBN 978-0-87021-976-4. OCLC 233144055.
- Stern, Robert Cecil (2007). The Hunter Hunted: Submarine versus Submarine: Encounters from World War I to the Present. Annapolis, Maryland: Naval Institute Press. ISBN 978-1-59114-379-6. OCLC 123127537.
- von Trapp, Georg (2007) [1935]. To the Last Salute: Memories of an Austrian U-Boat Commander. Lincoln: University of Nebraska Press. ISBN 978-0-8032-4667-6. OCLC 70866865.
