= French destroyer Épée =

At least two ships of the French Navy have been named Épée:

- French destroyer Épée (1900), a Framée-class destroyer launched in 1900 and sold for scrap in 1921
- French destroyer Épée (1938), a Le Hardi-class destroyer launched in 1938, she was renamed L'Adroit in 1941 and scuttled in 1942
