= French destroyer Yatagan =

Destroyer of the French Navy

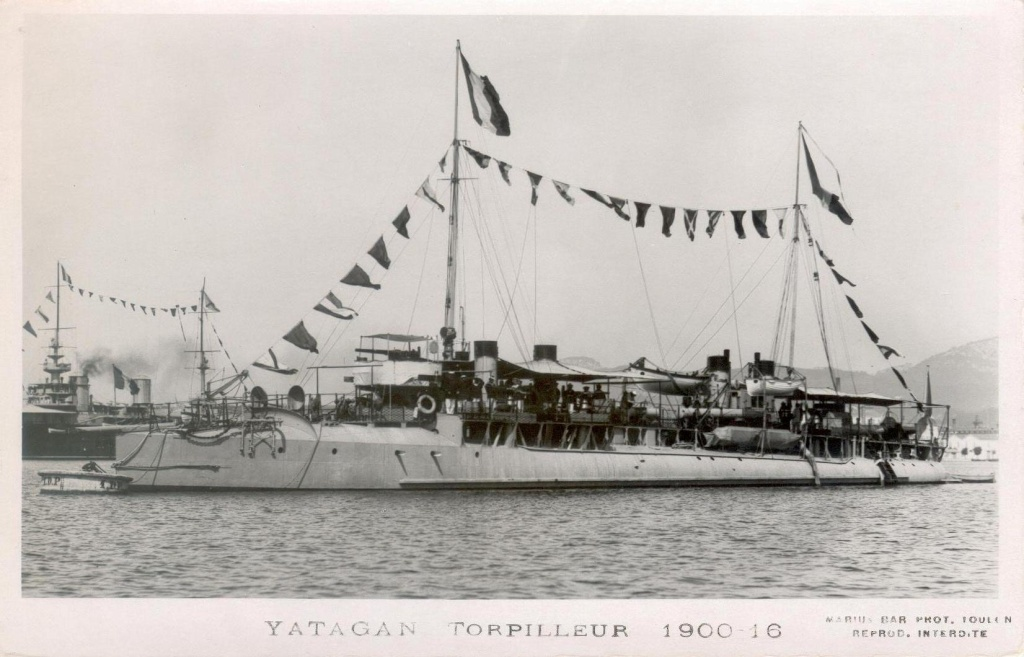
- Yataghan dressed for a review

History

France
- Name: Yatagan
- Namesake: Yatagan
- Builder: Ateliers et Chantiers de la Loire, Saint-Nazaire
- Laid down: 1897
- Launched: 27 July 1900
- Fate: Sunk in a collision, 3 November 1916

General characteristics
- Class & type: Framée-class destroyer
- Displacement: 319 t (314 long tons)
- Length: 58.2 m (190 ft 11 in) o/a
- Beam: 6.31 m (20 ft 8 in)
- Draft: 3.03 m (9 ft 11 in)
- Installed power: 4 water-tube boilers; 4,800–5,200 ihp (3,600–3,900 kW)
- Propulsion: 2 shafts; 2 triple-expansion steam engines
- Speed: 26 knots (48 km/h; 30 mph)
- Range: 2,055 nmi (3,806 km; 2,365 mi) at 10 knots (19 km/h; 12 mph)
- Complement: 48
- Armament: 1 × single 65 mm (2.6 in) gun; 6 × single 47 mm (1.9 in) guns; 2 × single 381 mm (15 in) torpedo tubes

Yatagan was one of four Framée-class destroyers built for the French Navy around the beginning of the 20th century. During the First World War, she was sunk after a collision with a British cargo ship in 1916.

== Design and description ==
The Framées had an overall length of 58.2 meters (190 ft 11 in), a beam of 6.31 meters (20 ft 8 in), and a maximum draft of 3.03 meters (9 ft 11 in). They displaced 319 metric tons (314 long tons) at deep load. The two triple-expansion steam engines, each driving one propeller shaft, produced a total of 4,200–5,200 indicated horsepower (3,132–3,878 kW), using steam provided by four water-tube boilers. The ships had a designed speed of 26 knots (48 km/h; 30 mph), but Yatagan reached 27.07 knots (50.13 km/h; 31.15 mph) during her sea trials on 5 October 1900. The ships carried enough coal to give them a range of 2,055 nautical miles (3,806 km; 2,365 mi) at 10 knots (19 km/h; 12 mph). Their complement consisted of four officers and forty-four enlisted men.

The Framée-class ships were armed with a single 65-millimeter (2.6 in) gun forward of the bridge and six 47-millimeter (1.9 in) Hotchkiss guns, three on each broadside. They were fitted with two single 381-millimeter (15 in) torpedo tubes, one between the funnels and the other on the stern. Two reload torpedoes were also carried.

== Construction and career ==
Yatagan was ordered from Ateliers et Chantiers de la Loire and the ship was laid down in 1897 at its shipyard in Nantes. The ship was launched on 20 July 1800. The ship served on fishery protection duties during the war. While thus engaged, she collided with the British steamer Teviot and sank in the English Channel off Dieppe, France, on 3 November 1916.

== Bibliography ==
- Campbell, N. J. M. (1979). "France". In Chesneau, Roger & Kolesnik, Eugene M. (eds.). Conway's All the World's Fighting Ships 1860–1905. Greenwich: Conway Maritime Press. pp. 283–333. ISBN 0-8317-0302-4.
- Couhat, Jean Labayle (1974). French Warships of World War I. London: Ian Allan. ISBN 0-7110-0445-5.
- Prévoteaux, Gérard (2017). La marine française dans la Grande guerre: les combattants oubliés: Tome I 1914–1915 [The French Navy during the Great War: The Forgotten Combatants, Book I 1914–1915]. Collection Navires & Histoire des Marines du Mond. Vol. 23. Le Vigen, France: Éditions Lela presse. ISBN 978-2-37468-000-2.
- Prévoteaux, Gérard (2017). La marine française dans la Grande guerre: les combattants oubliés: Tome II 1916–1918 [The French Navy during the Great War: The Forgotten Combatants, Book II 1916–1918]. Collection Navires & Histoire des Marines du Mond. Vol. 27. Le Vigen, France: Éditions Lela presse. ISBN 978-2-37468-001-9.
- Roberts, Stephen S. (2021). French Warships in the Age of Steam 1859–1914: Design, Construction, Careers and Fates. Barnsley, UK: Seaforth Publishing. ISBN 978-1-5267-4533-0.
