= French destroyer Pique =

Destroyer of the French Navy

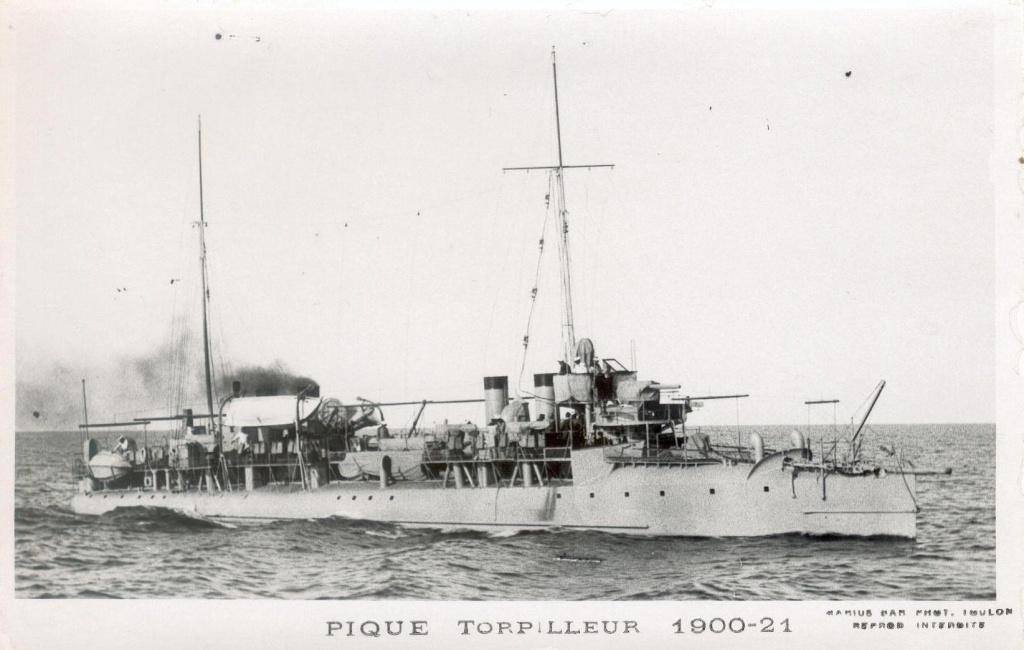
- Pique

History

France
- Name: Pique
- Namesake: Pike
- Ordered: 27 October 1897
- Builder: Forges et Chantiers de la Méditerranée, Le Havre-Graville
- Laid down: October 1897
- Launched: 31 March 1900
- Commissioned: May 1901
- Stricken: 28 January 1921
- Fate: Sold for scrap, 28 July 1921

General characteristics
- Class & type: Framée-class destroyer
- Displacement: 319 t (314 long tons)
- Length: 58.2 m (190 ft 11 in) o/a
- Beam: 6.31 m (20 ft 8 in)
- Draft: 3.02 m (9 ft 11 in)
- Installed power: 4 Normand boilers; 5,200 ihp (3,900 kW)
- Propulsion: 2 shafts; 2 triple-expansion steam engines
- Speed: 26 knots (48 km/h; 30 mph)
- Range: 1,541 nmi (2,854 km; 1,773 mi) at 14 knots (26 km/h; 16 mph)
- Complement: 4 officers, 57 enlisted men
- Armament: 1 × single 65 mm (2.6 in) gun; 6 × single 47 mm (1.9 in) guns; 2 × single 381 mm (15 in) torpedo tubes

Pique was one of four Framée-class destroyers built for the French Navy around the beginning of the 20th century. During the First World War, the ship saw service in the Mediterranean Sea and survived the war to be stricken from the naval register on 28 January 1921.

== Design and description ==
The Framées used the same hull design as the preceding Durandal class, but had a more powerful propulsion plant. The ships had an overall length of 58.2 meters (190 ft 11 in), a beam of 6.31 meters (20 ft 8 in), and a maximum draft of 3.02 meters (9 ft 11 in). They displaced 319 metric tons (314 long tons) at normal load. They were powered by a pair of triple-expansion steam engines, each driving one propeller shaft using steam provided by four Normand boilers. The engines were designed to produce a total of 5,200 indicated horsepower (3,878 kW) to give the ships a speed of 26 knots (48 km/h; 30 mph). During her sea trials on 1 February 1901, Pique only reached 25.9 knots (48.0 km/h; 29.8 mph) from 5,441 ihp (4,057 kW), the only ship of her class that failed to reach her designed speed. The ships carried enough coal to give them a range of 1,541 nautical miles (2,854 km; 1,773 mi) at 14 knots (26 km/h; 16 mph). Their complement consisted of 4 officers and 57 enlisted men.

The Framée-class ships were armed with a single 65-millimeter (2.6 in) gun forward of the bridge and six 47-millimeter (1.9 in) Hotchkiss guns, three on each broadside. They were fitted with two single rotating 381-millimeter (15 in) torpedo tubes, one between the funnels and the other on the stern.

== Construction and career ==
Pique (Pike) was ordered from Forges et Chantiers de la Méditerranée on 27 October 1897 and the ship was laid down in October at its shipyard in Le Havre-Granville. She was launched on 31 March 1900 and conducted her trials beginning in July 1900. They were not finished until May 1901 and Pique was commissioned that same month. The ship was initially assigned to the Mediterranean Squadron (Escadre de la Méditerranée), but was transferred to the Local Defense Force (Défense mobile) in French Algeria in June 1903. She was reduced to reserve in 1909–1910 and had been transferred to Bizerte, French Tunisia, in March 1910.

== Bibliography ==
- Campbell, N. J. M. (1979). "France". In Chesneau, Roger & Kolesnik, Eugene M. (eds.). Conway's All the World's Fighting Ships 1860–1905. Greenwich: Conway Maritime Press. pp. 283–333. ISBN 0-8317-0302-4.
- Jordan, John & Caresse, Philippe (2017). French Battleships of World War One. Annapolis, Maryland: Naval Institute Press. ISBN 978-1-59114-639-1.
- Prévoteaux, Gérard (2017). La marine française dans la Grande guerre: les combattants oubliés: Tome I 1914–1915 [The French Navy during the Great War: The Forgotten Combatants, Book I 1914–1915]. Collection Navires & Histoire des Marines du Mond. Vol. 23. Le Vigen, France: Éditions Lela presse. ISBN 978-2-37468-000-2.
- Prévoteaux, Gérard (2017). La marine française dans la Grande guerre: les combattants oubliés: Tome II 1916–1918 [The French Navy during the Great War: The Forgotten Combatants, Book II 1916–1918]. Collection Navires & Histoire des Marines du Mond. Vol. 27. Le Vigen, France: Éditions Lela presse. ISBN 978-2-37468-001-9.
- Roberts, Stephen S. (2021). French Warships in the Age of Steam 1859–1914: Design, Construction, Careers and Fates. Barnsley, UK: Seaforth Publishing. ISBN 978-1-5267-4533-0.
- Roche, Jean-Michel (2005). Dictionnaire des bâtiments de la flotte de guerre française de Colbert à nos jours [Dictionary of French Warships from Colbert to the Present Day]. Vol. II: 1870–2006. Group Retozel-Maury Millau. ISBN 978-2-9525917-0-6. OCLC 165892922.
