= French cruiser Edgar Quinet =

French armored cruiser of the 1900s

Edgar Quinet
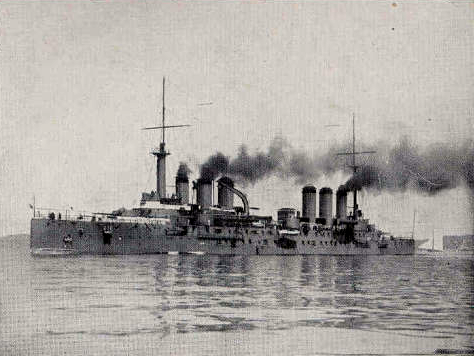
- Edgar Quinet in 1913

History

France
- Name: Edgar Quinet
- Namesake: Edgar Quinet
- Builder: Lorient
- Laid down: November 1905
- Launched: 21 September 1907
- Commissioned: January 1911
- Home port: Toulon
- Fate: Wrecked, 4 January 1930

General characteristics
- Class & type: Edgar Quinet-class cruiser
- Displacement: 13,847 long tons (14,069 t)
- Length: 158.9 m (521 ft)
- Beam: 21.51 m (70 ft 7 in)
- Draft: 8.41 m (27 ft 7 in)
- Installed power: 40 × Belleville boilers; 36,000 ihp (26,845 kW)
- Propulsion: 3 × Triple-expansion steam engines; 3 × screw propellers
- Speed: 23 knots (43 km/h; 26 mph)
- Crew: 859–892
- Armament: 14 × 194 mm (7.6 in) guns; 20 × 65 mm (2.6 in) guns; 2 × 450 mm (18 in) torpedo tubes
- Armor: Belt: 150 mm (5.9 in); Gun turrets: 200 mm (7.9 in); Casemates: 194 mm (7.6 in); Conning tower: 200 mm

Edgar Quinet was an armored cruiser of the French Navy, the lead ship of her class. She and her sister ship, Waldeck-Rousseau, were the last class of armored cruiser to be built by the French Navy. Edgar Quinet was laid down in November 1905, launched in September 1907, and completed in January 1911. Armed with a main battery of fourteen 194-millimeter (7.6 in) guns, she was more powerful than most other armored cruisers, but she had entered service more than two years after the first battlecruiser—HMS Invincible—had rendered armored cruisers obsolescent.

At the outbreak of World War I in August 1914, Edgar Quinet participated in the hunt for the German battlecruiser SMS Goeben and then joined the blockade of the Austro-Hungarian Navy in the Adriatic. She took part in the Battle of Antivari later in August, and the seizure of Corfu in January 1916, but saw no further action during the war. In 1922, she evacuated over a thousand civilians from Smyrna during the climax of the Greco-Turkish War. Converted into a training ship in the mid-1920s, Edgar Quinet ran aground on a rock off the Algerian coast on 4 January 1930 and sank five days later.

== Description ==
Plan and profile drawing of the Edgar Quinet class, note that the main armament is incorrectly labelled as 6" guns.

The Edgar Quinet class were designed initially as sister ships of the preceding cruiser Ernest Renan, but instead of the mixed battery of 194 mm (7.6 in) and 165 mm (6.5 in) guns, the two ships were altered to carry a uniform battery of 194 mm weapons. Other minor changes were introduced during the design process, including some features of the latest French pre-dreadnought battleships, including a straight stem. The two Edgar Quinet-class cruisers proved to be the last major warships of the French fleet to rely on reciprocating machinery for their propulsion systems.

Edgar Quinet was 158.9 meters (521 ft) long overall, with a beam of 21.51 m (70.6 ft) and a draft of 8.41 m (27.6 ft). She displaced 13,847 long tons (14,069 t). Her power plant consisted of three triple-expansion engines powered by forty coal-fired Belleville boilers, which were trunked into six funnels in two groups of three. Her engines were rated at 36,000 indicated horsepower (27,000 kW) and produced a top speed of 23 knots (43 km/h; 26 mph). She had a crew of between 859 and 892 officers and enlisted men.

Edgar Quinet was armed with a main battery of fourteen 194 mm (7.6 in) 50-caliber M1902 guns; four were in twin gun turrets forward and aft, with three single gun turrets on either broadside. The last four guns were mounted in casemates abreast the main and aft conning towers. Close-range defense against torpedo boats was provided by a battery of twenty 65 mm (2.6 in) guns in casemates in the ship's hull. She was also equipped with two 450 mm (17.7 in) torpedo tubes submerged in the hull. She was protected with an armored belt that was 150 mm (5.9 in) thick amidships. The gun turrets had 200 mm (7.9 in) thick plating, while the casemates had marginally thinner protection, at 194 mm. The main conning tower had 200 mm thick sides.

== Service history ==
Edgar Quinet at her launching

Edgar Quinet was laid down at Brest in November 1905 and launched on 21 September 1907. She was completed in January 1911 and commissioned into the French fleet. The ship was the most powerful armored cruiser completed by France, but she entered service two years after the British battlecruiser HMS Invincible, which rendered the armored cruiser obsolescent as a warship type. In April 1912, she was assigned to the 1st Light Squadron, along with her sister ship Waldeck-Rousseau and the armored cruiser Ernest Renan.

In 1913, Edgar Quinet participated in an international naval demonstration in the Ionian Sea to protest the Balkan Wars. Ships from other navies included in the demonstration were the British pre-dreadnought battleship HMS King Edward VII, the Austro-Hungarian pre-dreadnought SMS Zrínyi, the Italian pre-dreadnought Ammiraglio di Saint Bon, and the German light cruiser SMS Breslau. The most important action of the combined flotilla, which was under the command of British Admiral Cecil Burney, was to blockade the Montenegrin coast. The goal of the blockade was to prevent Serbian reinforcements from supporting the siege at Scutari, where Montenegro had besieged a combined force of Albanians and Ottomans. Pressured by the international blockade, Serbia withdrew its army from Scutari, which was subsequently occupied by a joint Allied ground force.

=== World War I ===
Illustration of Edgar Quinet

At the outbreak of World War I in August 1914, Edgar Quinet was anchored off Durazzo with the British cruiser HMS Defence and destroyer HMS Grampus and the German Breslau. The ships were moored there in a show of international support for a conference in Scutari over the status of Albania. Edgar Quinet and the armored cruisers Ernest Renan and Jules Michelet were mobilized as the First Light Division and tasked with hunting down the German battlecruiser SMS Goeben and her consort Breslau. These ships, along with a flotilla of twelve destroyers, were to steam to Philippeville on 4 August, but the German cruisers had bombarded the port the previous day. This attack, coupled with reports that suggested the Germans would try to break out of the Mediterranean into the Atlantic, prompted the French high command to send Edgar Quinet and the First Light Division further west, to Algiers.

After the German ships escaped to Constantinople, rather than attack the French troop transports from North Africa as had been expected, Edgar Quinet joined the rest of the French fleet in its blockade of the Adriatic Sea, based out of Navarino. The fleet, commanded by Admiral Augustin Boué de Lapeyrère, had assembled by the night of 15 August; the following morning, it conducted a sweep into the Adriatic and encountered the Austro-Hungarian cruiser SMS Zenta. In the ensuing Battle of Antivari, Zenta was sunk, with no losses on the French side. The French fleet then withdrew due to the threat of Austro-Hungarian U-boats in the area.

By the beginning of 1916, the fleet's modern armored cruisers had been organized into two units, the 1st and 2nd Light Divisions; Edgar Quinet served as the flagship of the former, which also included Waldeck-Rousseau and Ernest Renan. Both divisions supported the main French battle fleet. On 8 January, Edgar Quinet, Waldeck-Rousseau, Ernest Renan and Jules Ferry embarked a contingent of Chasseurs Alpins (mountain troops) to seize the Greek island of Corfu. The cruisers sent the troops ashore on the night of 10 January; the Greek officials on the island protested the move but offered no resistance. At some point between 1917 and 1918, the ship had her mainmast removed to allow her to operate a kite balloon.

=== Later career ===
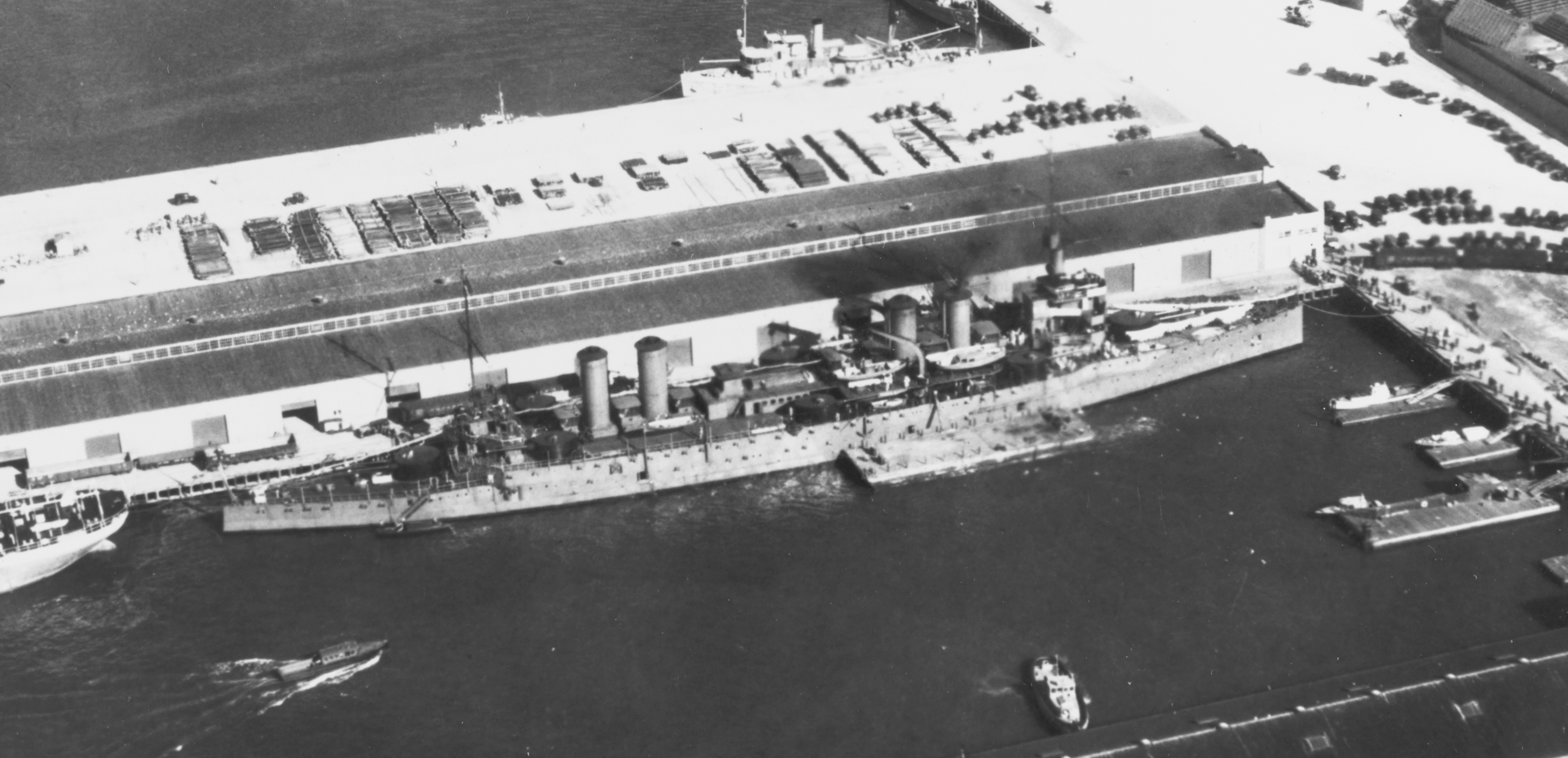
Edgar Quinet in San Diego, California in 1928

Edgar Quinet continued her service in the eastern Mediterranean after the end of the war in November 1918. She was reduced to reserve in Bizerte on 1 July 1919, remaining out of service until June 1920. She was recommissioned for Light Division, thereafter being transferred to the Eastern Mediterranean Squadron in July 1921 and later the Levant Division. During the culmination of the Greco-Turkish War that immediately followed World War I, Edgar Quinet rescued 1,200 people from the Great Fire of Smyrna in 1922. She was transferred to the Mediterranean Squadron on 1 October 1923, serving there until June 1924, when she was placed in a reduced commission status at Toulon. In 1925, Edgar Quinet was converted into a training ship to replace the armored cruiser Jeanne d'Arc. The work lasted until 1927, and included the reduction of her armament to ten of her 194 mm guns, the removal of two of her funnels and their boilers, and a reconstruction of her bridge. The empty boiler rooms were converted to training spaces.

After returning to service on 12 October 1928, the ship was assigned as a training ship for cadets from the École Navale (Naval Academy). Then-Captain François Darlan commanded the ship in 1928, during her first training cruise overseas, during which ship sailed as far as California in the United States, returning to France the following year. In 1929, Edgar Quinet underwent an overhaul; during this modernization she was fitted with equipment to handle floatplanes for reconnaissance purposes. On 4 January 1930, Edgar Quinet ran aground off the coast of Algeria west of Oran and proved to be a total loss. She sank five days later.
