= French cruiser Waldeck-Rousseau =

French armored cruiser of the 1900s

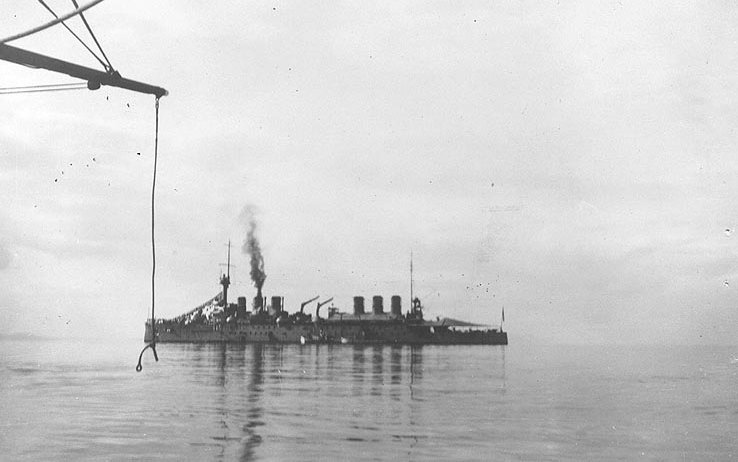
- Waldeck-Rousseau off Constantinople in 1922

History

France
- Name: Waldeck-Rousseau
- Namesake: Pierre Waldeck-Rousseau
- Ordered: 31 July 1905
- Builder: Arsenal de Lorient
- Laid down: 16 June 1906
- Launched: 4 March 1908
- Completed: August 1911
- Fate: Scrapped, 1941–1943

General characteristics
- Class & type: Edgar Quinet-class cruiser
- Displacement: 13,995 long tons (14,220 t)
- Length: 158.9 m (521 ft)
- Beam: 21.51 m (70 ft 7 in)
- Draft: 8.41 m (27 ft 7 in)
- Installed power: 40 × Belleville boilers; 36,000 ihp (26,845 kW)
- Propulsion: 3 × Triple-expansion steam engines; 3 × screw propellers
- Speed: 23 knots (43 km/h; 26 mph)
- Crew: 859–892
- Armament: 14 × 194 mm (7.6 in) guns; 20 × 65 mm (2.6 in) guns; 2 × 450 mm (18 in) torpedo tubes
- Armor: Belt: 150 mm (5.9 in); Gun turrets: 200 mm (7.9 in); Casemates: 194 mm (7.6 in); Conning tower: 200 mm

Waldeck-Rousseau was an armored cruiser built for the French Navy in the first decade of the 20th century. She was the second and final member of the Edgar Quinet class, the last class of armored cruiser to be built by the French Navy. She was laid down at the Arsenal de Lorient in June 1906, launched in March 1908, and commissioned in August 1911. Armed with a main battery of fourteen 194-millimeter (7.6 in) guns, she was more powerful than most other armored cruisers, but she had entered service more than two years after the first battlecruiser—HMS Invincible—had rendered the armored cruiser obsolescent. Waldeck-Rousseau nevertheless proved to be a workhorse of the French Mediterranean Fleet.

After the outbreak of World War I, Waldeck-Rousseau joined the main French fleet that blockaded the southern end of the Adriatic to prevent the Austro-Hungarian Navy from operating in the Mediterranean. In October and November, Waldeck-Rousseau was twice attacked by Austro-Hungarian U-boats but she escaped unscathed in both engagements. She thereafter alternated between stints in the southern Adriatic and patrols in the eastern Mediterranean once the Ottoman Empire joined the war in November.

After the war, the British and French intervened in the Russian Civil War; this included a major naval deployment to the Baltic Sea, which included Waldeck-Rousseau. Shortly after arriving, her crew mutinied due to poor living conditions and a desire to return to France. The unrest was quickly suppressed, and Waldeck-Rousseau joined the effort to support the Whites against the Red Bolsheviks. In May 1929, the ship was sent to French Indochina to serve as the flagship of the Far East squadron. She remained there until May 1932, when she returned to France, where she was decommissioned and hulked. Waldeck-Rousseau was ultimately scrapped in 1941–44.

== Description ==
Plan and profile drawing of the Edgar Quinet class

The Edgar Quinet class were designed initially as sister ships of the preceding cruiser Ernest Renan, but instead of the mixed battery of 194 mm (7.6 in) and 165 mm (6.5 in) guns, the two ships were altered to carry a uniform battery of 194 mm weapons. Other minor changes were introduced during the design process, including some features of the latest French pre-dreadnought battleships, including a straight stem. The two Edgar Quinet-class cruisers proved to be the last major warship of the French fleet to rely on reciprocating machinery for their propulsion systems.

Waldeck-Rousseau was 158.9 meters (521 ft) long overall, with a beam of 21.51 m (70.6 ft) and a draft of 8.41 m (27.6 ft). She displaced 13,995 long tons (14,220 t). Her power plant consisted of three triple-expansion engines powered by forty coal-fired Niclausse boilers, which were trunked into six funnels in two groups of three. Her engines were rated at 36,000 indicated horsepower (27,000 kW) and produced a top speed of 23 knots (43 km/h; 26 mph). She had a crew of between 859 and 892 officers and enlisted men.

Waldeck-Rousseau was armed with a main battery of fourteen 194 mm (7.6 in) 50-caliber M1902 guns; four were in twin gun turrets forward and aft, with three single gun turrets on either broadside. The last four guns were mounted in casemates abreast the main and aft conning towers. Close-range defense against torpedo boats was provided by a battery of twenty 65 mm (2.6 in) guns in casemates in the ship's hull. She was also equipped with two 450 mm (17.7 in) torpedo tubes submerged in the hull. She was protected with an armored belt that was 150 mm (5.9 in) thick amidships. The gun turrets had 200 mm (7.9 in) thick plating, while the casemates had marginally thinner protection, at 194 mm. The main conning tower had 200 mm thick sides.

During World War I, several 14-pounder and 9-pounder anti-aircraft guns were added, with the older 9-pounder guns being removed to keep displacement down. In 1930, she was modified to carry a reconnaissance seaplane.

== Service history ==
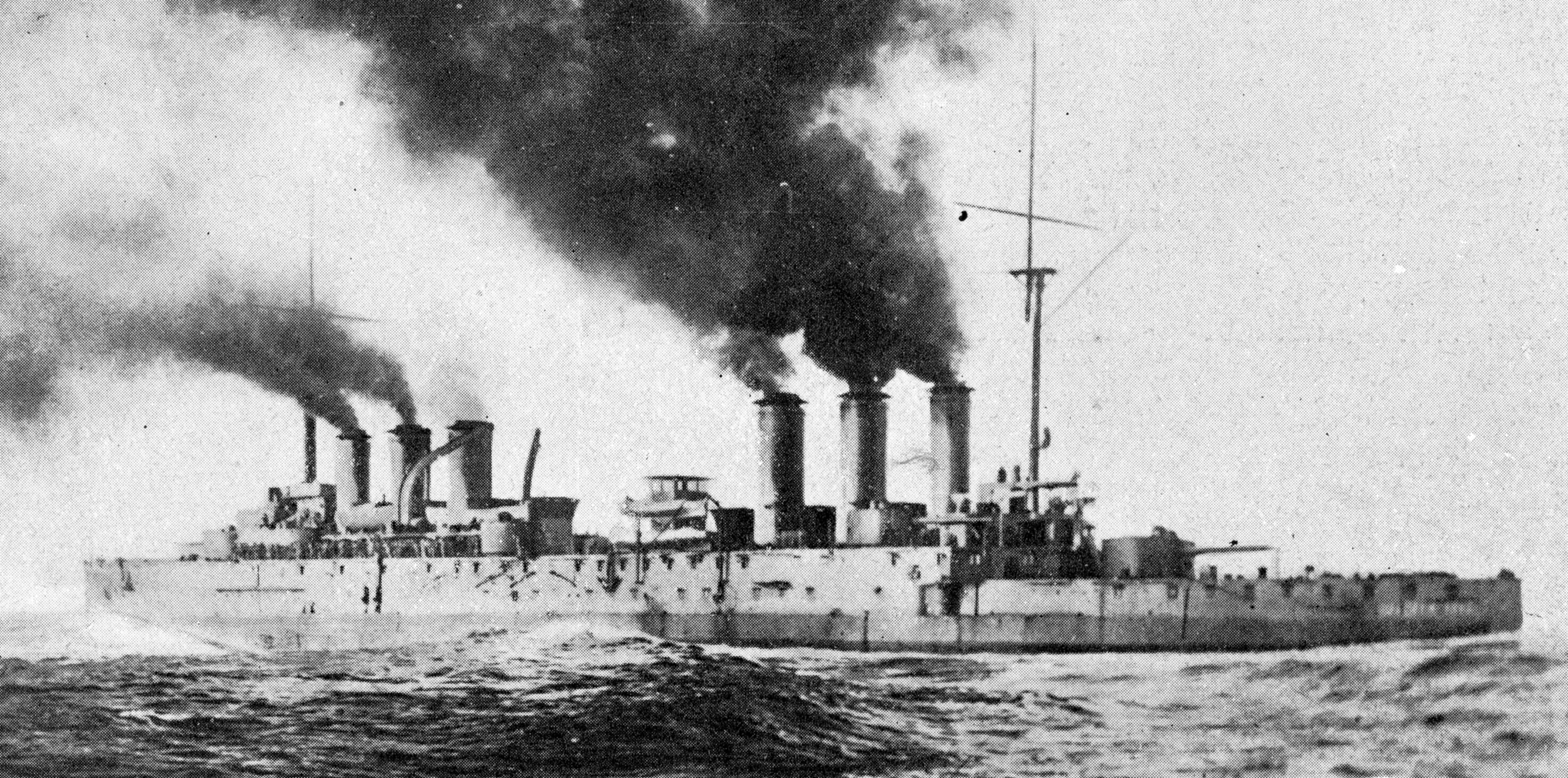
Waldeck-Rousseau underway

Waldeck-Rousseau, named for the recently deceased Prime Minister of France, Pierre Waldeck-Rousseau, was ordered on 31 July 1905 and was laid down at the Arsenal de Lorient on 16 June 1906. She was launched on 4 March 1908, and fitting out work was completed in time to begin sea trials in January 1911. While on her acceptance trials on 2 February, she struck a submerged object that bent her port propeller shaft and damaged the screw. Waldeck-Rousseau was completed in August; the ship was the most powerful armored cruiser completed by France, but she entered service two years after the British battlecruiser HMS Invincible, which rendered the armored cruiser obsolescent as a warship type. Her lengthy construction interfered with the scheduled keel-laying for the new predreadnought battleship Mirabeau, which could not be started until Waldeck-Rousseau was launched. After entering service the new cruiser was assigned to the Mediterranean Fleet, based in Toulon. In April 1912, she was assigned to the 1st Light Squadron, along with her sister ship Edgar Quinet and the armored cruiser Ernest Renan.

=== World War I ===
At the outbreak of World War I in August 1914, Waldeck-Rousseau was under repair at Toulon owing to a grounding incident off Golfe-Juan during a hurricane on 22 February. Work was completed by 5 September, and by the end of the month she had joined the French fleet blockading the Austro-Hungarian Navy at the southern end of the Adriatic Sea. On 17 October she briefly engaged Austro-Hungarian forces off Cattaro; she fired at the Austro-Hungarian U-boat SM U-4 that had tried to torpedo her and engaged several destroyers that were supported by an airplane before she broke off the action to rejoin the French fleet. She was unsuccessfully attacked a second time by an Austro-Hungarian U-boat while on patrol on 4 November. On this occasion, she was patrolling with the cruiser Ernest Renan; Waldeck-Rousseau engaged the submarine and forced it to withdraw.

On 30 November, the cruiser was transferred to the Ionian Sea and was based in Salonika. While there, Waldeck-Rousseau patrolled the eastern Mediterranean and the coast of the Levant. She returned to Malta on 13 December, where she resumed patrols in the southern Adriatic. In early March 1915 Waldeck-Rousseau returned to the Ionian. From 25 April to 1 May she briefly patrolled in the Strait of Otranto at the southern end of the Adriatic, before returning to her station in the Ionian.

By the beginning of 1916, the fleet's modern armored cruisers had been organized into two units, the 1st and 2nd Light Divisions; Waldeck-Rousseau served in the former, which also included Edgar Quinet and Ernest Renan. Both divisions supported the main French battle fleet. On 8 January 1916, Waldeck-Rousseau, her sister Edgar Quinet, Ernest Renan and Jules Ferry embarked a contingent of Chasseurs Alpins (mountain troops) to seize the Greek island of Corfu. The cruisers sent the troops ashore on the night of 10 January; the Greek officials on the island protested the move but offered no resistance. For the rest of the war, she patrolled in the Ionian and eastern Mediterranean but did not see further action.

=== Black Sea operations, 1919–1920 ===
Starting in 1919, the French Navy joined the Allied intervention in the Russian Civil War in the Black Sea to support the Whites against the Red Bolsheviks. Waldeck-Rousseau arrived in early 1919, flying the flag of Admiral Caubet. While in Odessa on 26–29 April 1919, sailors aboard Waldeck-Rousseau mutinied; the ship, which had just arrived from France with a fresh crew, had not yet had contact with Russian revolutionaries. Nevertheless, the crew had quickly grown weary of poor living conditions and wanted to return to France. After three days, the unrest was suppressed and she returned to service, though Caubet was relieved of command for failing to control his crew. The Vietnamese communist Tôn Đức Thắng, who was at that time serving in the French Navy, claimed to have participated in the mutiny, but French records do not list him as having been aboard Waldeck-Rousseau at the time. At the same time, the crews of other French ships in Constantinople became restive, and so Admiral Jean-Françoise-Charles Amet refused to allow Waldeck-Rousseau to join the rest of the fleet there, owing to her crew's earlier mutiny.

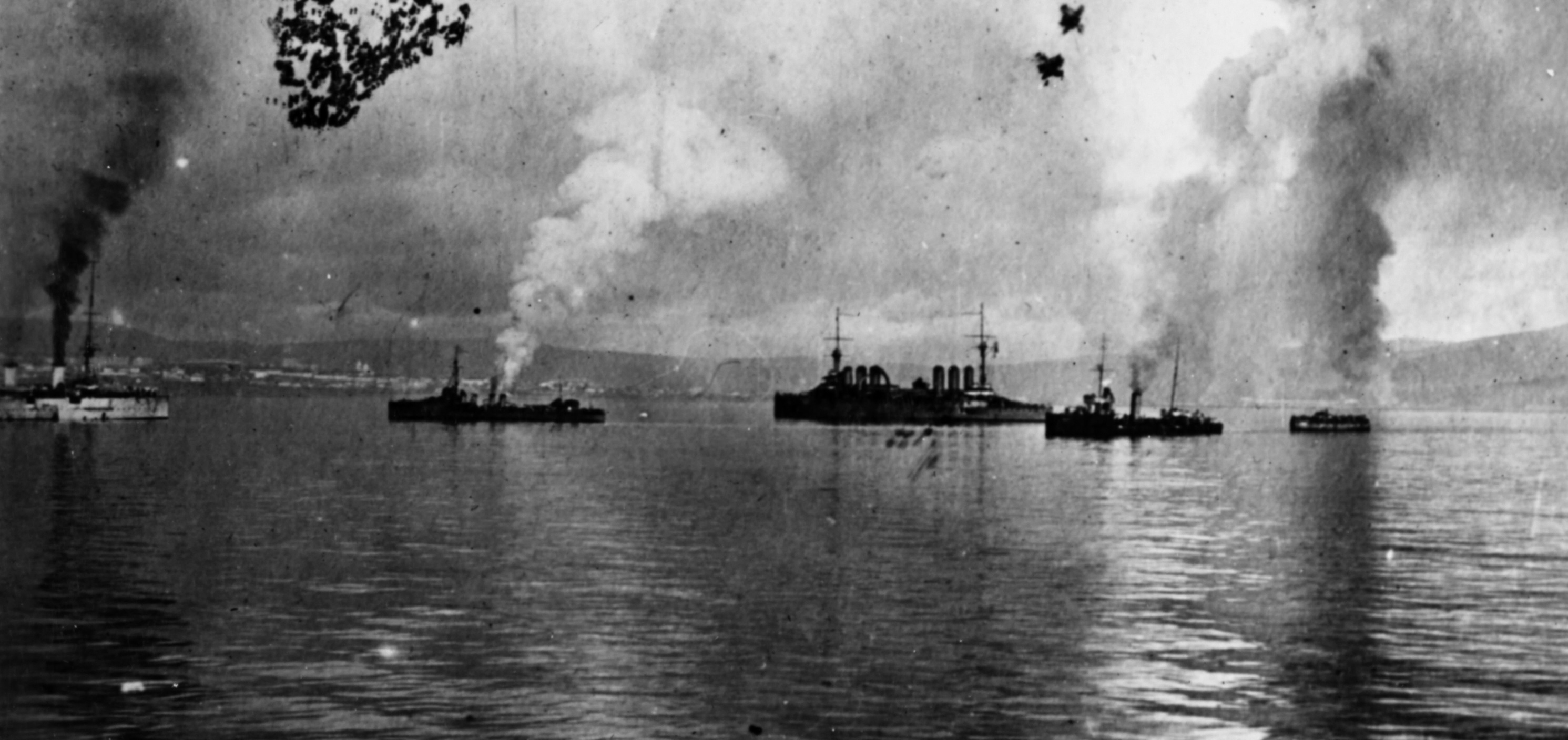
Waldeck-Rousseau in Novorossiysk in March 1920

On 26 March 1920, Waldeck-Rousseau provided gunfire support to the evacuating White Russian forces outside Novorossiysk, along with the British dreadnought battleship Emperor of India. The Anglo-French fleet then evacuated the White Russians from the city to the Crimean peninsula. Later in the year, she assisted in the evacuation of General Pyotr Nikolayevich Wrangel's army. The motley collection of ships departed the Crimea on 14 November; Waldeck-Rousseau steamed at the rear of the fleet as it made its way to Constantinople.

Waldeck-Rousseau remained in the Black Sea while the fleet continued on into the Mediterranean and eventually to internment at Bizerte in Algeria. On 16 December 1922, the French transport SS Vinh Long caught fire while in the Sea of Marmara. The United States destroyer USS Bainbridge arrived on the scene first and took off the survivors, which numbered 482 of the 495 crew and passengers that had been aboard. Waldeck-Rousseau arrived shortly thereafter, and the survivors were transferred to the larger cruiser, since she could better accommodate them. For his part in the rescue operations, the commander of Bainbridge—Lieutenant Commander Walter Edwards—was awarded the Medal of Honor, the French Legion of Honour, and the British Distinguished Service Order.

=== Fate ===
In September 1923, Waldeck-Rousseau was reduced to the reserve fleet, based in Toulon. She remained out of service until April 1929, when she was recommissioned for a tour in East Asian waters. She left France on 10 May and arrived on 22 June, where she replaced the cruiser Jules Michelet as the flagship of the French Far East Squadron. Waldeck-Rousseau served there until May 1932, when she departed for France, having been replaced by the light cruiser Primauguet. Waldeck-Rousseau reached France on 3 July. After returning to France, she was decommissioned and placed in reserve.

On 14 June 1936, she was stricken and subsequently converted into a hulk at Landévennec, outside Brest. She remained in the Navy's inventory at the start of World War II in September 1939. In May–June 1940, during the Battle of France, she was towed from Landévennec to a position about half a mile from the main breakwater that sheltered Brest. After the Germans defeated France and occupied Brest, they prevented the French from returning aboard Waldeck-Rousseau; the vessel was slowly taking on water, and without the ability of the crew to operate her pumps, she eventually foundered on 8 August. She was later broken up for scrap in situ between 1941 and 1944, though some parts of the ship remain on the sea floor. During this period, in early 1942, the Germans raised the wreck and disguised Waldeck-Rousseau as the heavy cruiser Prinz Eugen as a decoy before they launched Operation Cerberus.
