= French cruiser Ernest Renan =

French armored cruiser of the 1900s

Ernest Renan
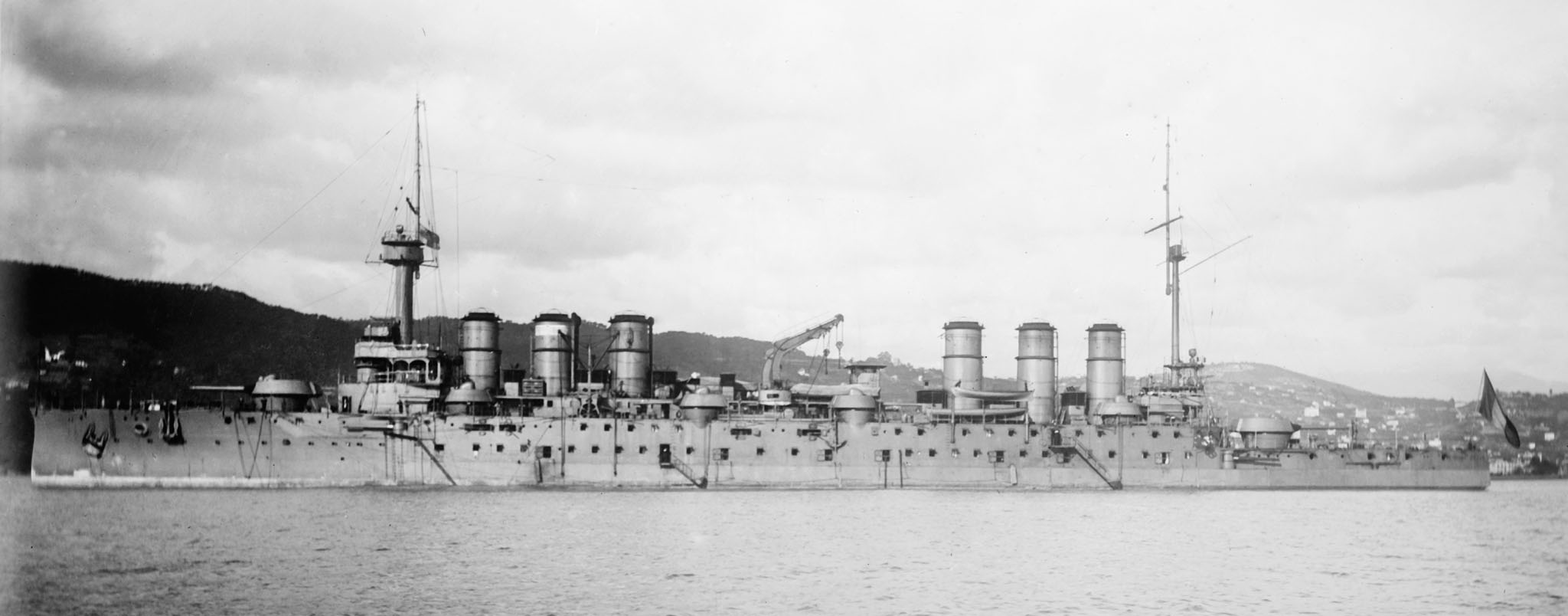
- Ernest Renan at anchor

Class overview
- Operators: French Navy
- Preceded by: Jules Michelet
- Succeeded by: Edgar Quinet class

History
- Name: Ernest Renan
- Namesake: Ernest Renan
- Builder: Chantiers de Penhoët, Saint-Nazaire
- Laid down: 21 October 1903
- Launched: 9 April 1906
- Completed: 1909
- Out of service: 1931
- Stricken: 1931
- Fate: Sunk as a target ship, 1931

General characteristics
- Type: Armored cruiser
- Displacement: 13,644 tonnes (13,429 long tons)
- Length: 159 m (521 ft 8 in) (o/a)
- Beam: 21.5 m (70 ft 6 in)
- Draft: 8.4 m (27 ft 7 in)
- Installed power: 37,000 ihp (28,000 kW); 42 × Niclausse boilers
- Propulsion: 3 × triple-expansion steam engines; 3 × screw propellers
- Speed: 23 knots (43 km/h; 26 mph)
- Range: 5,100 nmi (9,400 km; 5,900 mi) at 10 knots (19 km/h; 12 mph)
- Complement: 750 or 824
- Armament: 4 × 194 mm (7.6 in) guns; 12 × 164 mm (6.5 in) guns; 16 × 65 mm (2.6 in) guns; 8 × 47 mm (1.9 in) Hotchkiss guns; 2 × 450 mm (17.7 in) torpedo tubes
- Armor: Belt: 58–152 mm (2.3–6 in); Primary gun turrets: 203 mm (8 in); Intermediate gun turrets: 170 mm (6.5 in); Bulkhead: 89 mm (3.5 in); Deck: 46–66 mm (1.8–2.6 in); Conning tower: 8 in (203 mm)

Ernest Renan was an armored cruiser built for the French Navy in the first decade of the 20th century. At the outbreak of World War I in August 1914, she participated in the hunt for the German battlecruiser SMS Goeben and then joined the blockade of the Austro-Hungarian Navy in the Adriatic. She took part in the Battle of Antivari later in August, and the seizure of Corfu in January 1916, but saw no further action during the war. After the war, the British and French intervened in the Russian Civil War; this included a major naval deployment to the Black Sea, which included Ernest Renan. She served as a training ship in the late 1920s before she was sunk as a target ship in the 1930s.

== Design and description ==
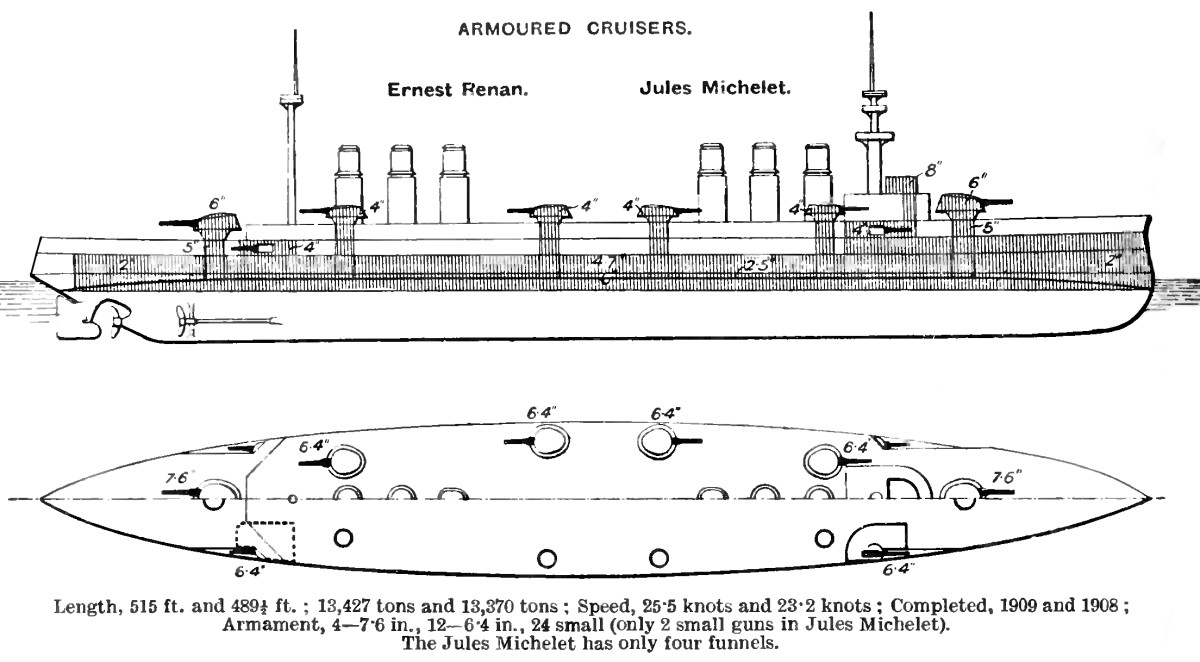
Right elevation and deck plan as depicted in Brassey's Naval Annual 1923

Ernest Renan was intended to be a member of the Leon Gambetta class, but naval architect Emile Bertin repeatedly tinkered with the design and decided to lengthen the ship in an attempt to increase her speed. She measured 159 meters (521 ft 8 in) overall, with a beam of 21.4 meters (70 ft 3 in). Ernest Renan had a draft of 8.2 meters (26 ft 11 in) and displaced 13,644 metric tons (13,429 long tons). Her crew numbered either 750 or 824 officers and enlisted men.

The ship had three propeller shafts, each powered by a single vertical triple-expansion steam engine. They were rated at a total of 37,000 indicated horsepower (28,000 kW) using steam provided by 42 Niclausse boilers. The boilers were grouped into two sets of boiler rooms that were separated by the amidships gun turrets and their magazines. They exhausted into six funnels, which were grouped in two widely spaced sets of three. Ernest Renan had a designed speed of 23 knots (43 km/h; 26 mph), but reached 24.4 knots (45.2 km/h; 28.1 mph) from 37,685 ihp (28,102 kW) during her sea trials. She initially carried up to 2,260 tonnes (2,220 long tons) of coal, although this was later reduced to 1,870 tonnes (1,840 long tons), which gave her a range of 5,100 nautical miles (9,400 km; 5,900 mi) at a speed of 10 knots (19 km/h; 12 mph).

Ernest Renan's main armament consisted of four 50-caliber Canon de 194 mm Modèle 1902 guns mounted in twin gun turrets fore and aft. Her secondary armament was twelve 45-caliber Canon de 164 mm Modèle 1893-96 guns. Eight of these were in single turrets on the forecastle deck and the other four were in casemates. For anti-torpedo boat defence she carried sixteen 65-millimeter (2.6 in) guns and eight 47-millimeter (1.9 in) Hotchkiss guns. She was also armed with two submerged 450-millimetre (17.7 in) torpedo tubes. During World War I, some of her lighter guns were replaced by anti-aircraft guns, but details are lacking.

The waterline armored belt of Ernest Renan was 152 millimeters (6 in) thick amidships and extended from 1.35 meters (4 ft 5 in) below the waterline to 2.31 meters (7 ft 7 in) above it. The armor thinned to 102 millimeters (4.0 in) forward of the foremast and 84 millimeters (3.3 in) aft of the mainmast. It did not extend all the way to the stern and terminated in a 89-millimeter (3.5 in) bulkhead. The upper strake of armor was 36–58 millimeters (1.4–2.3 in) thick and extended to the upper deck. The curved protective deck had a thickness of 46 millimeters (1.8 in) along its centerline that increased to 66 millimeters (2.6 in) at its outer edges and 71 millimeters (2.8 in) over the rudder. A watertight internal cofferdam, filled with cellulose, ran the length of the ship between the upper and main decks.

The main gun turrets had 203-millimeter (8 in) thick sides and 51-millimeter (2 in) roofs and the intermediate turrets were protected by 170-millimeter (6.5 in) sides and had 30-millimeter (1.2 in) roofs. The supports for the turrets ranged from 102 to 183 millimeters (4 to 7.2 in) in thickness for the main turrets and 64 to 132 millimeters (2.5 to 5.2 in) for the intermediate turrets. The conning tower was 203 mm thick. (Note: The armor layout is somewhat unclear; in Directory of the World's Capital Ships, Silverstone provides different figures, including an armored belt 90–170 mm (3.5–6.7 in) thick and thinner protection for the main turrets and intermediate turrets, at 170 mm (6.7 in) and 165 mm (6.5 in), respectively. See Silverstone, p. 82, for further details.)

== Construction and career ==
Ernest Renan, named after the philosopher and philologist Ernest Renan, was built at the Chantiers de Penhoët shipyard in Saint-Nazaire. Her keel was laid down on 21 October 1903 and she was launched on 9 April 1906. (Note: Silverstone, p. 97, gives 1 October 1903 and 9 March 1906 respectively; however the contemporary professional article differs. The linked article contains interesting photographs of the hull on the ways and after launch.) During the launch, general manager of Schneider-Creusot Maurice Geny died in a falling incident. Fitting-out work was completed by early 1909, and she was commissioned into the French Navy in February. After entering service, Ernest Renan was assigned to the cruiser squadron of the Mediterranean Fleet, based in Toulon. In April 1912, she was assigned to the 1st Light Squadron, along with the two Edgar Quinet-class cruisers.

=== World War I ===
Ernest Renan steaming at high speed

At the outbreak of World War I in August 1914, Ernest Renan and the armored cruisers Edgar Quinet and Jules Michelet were mobilized as the First Light Division and tasked with hunting down the German battlecruiser SMS Goeben and the light cruiser SMS Breslau. These ships, along with a flotilla of twelve destroyers, was to steam to Philippeville on 4 August, but the German ships had bombarded the port the previous day. This attack, coupled with reports that suggested the Germans would try to break out of the Mediterranean into the Atlantic, prompted the French high command to send Ernest Renan and the First Light Division further west, to Algiers in an attempt to block the Germans.

After the German ships escaped to Constantinople, rather than attack the French troop transports from North Africa as had been expected, the French turned to address the next naval threat: the Austro-Hungarian Navy in the Adriatic Sea. Ernest Renan joined the rest of the French fleet in its blockade of the Adriatic Sea. The fleet, commanded by Admiral Augustin Boué de Lapeyrère, had assembled by the night of 15 August; the following morning, it conducted a sweep into the Adriatic and encountered the Austro-Hungarian cruiser SMS Zenta. In the ensuing Battle of Antivari, Zenta was sunk, with no losses on the French side. The French fleet then withdrew due to the threat of Austro-Hungarian U-boats in the area.

On 8 January 1916, Ernest Renan, Edgar Quinet, Waldeck-Rousseau and Jules Ferry embarked a contingent of Chasseurs Alpins (mountain troops) to seize the Greek island of Corfu. The cruisers sent the troops ashore on the night of 10 January; the Greek officials on the island protested the move but offered no resistance. On 22 December, Ernest Renan collided with an Italian steamer, several passengers of which drowned in the accident. Ernest Renan spent the rest of the war in the Mediterranean and did not see further action.

=== Postwar ===
Shortly after the end of the war, British and French warships began to operate in the Black Sea in what became a large-scale intervention in the Russian Civil War against the Bolsheviks. Ernest Renan was among the first Allied warships to enter the area; she arrived in Novorossiysk with the British light cruiser HMS Liverpool and two torpedo boats on 23 November 1918. On 18 March 1921, the leadership of the Democratic Republic of Georgia was evacuated on board Ernest Renan to France after the Red Army invasion of Georgia.

After returning to France, the ship's mainmast was removed to allow her to tow a balloon and anti-aircraft guns were installed on the roofs of the after 164 mm gun turrets. Ernest Renan finished her active career as a gunnery training ship from 1927 to 1929, after which she was stricken from the naval register. During her tenure in the gunnery school, she was commanded by Émile Muselier, who went on to serve as the commander of the Free French Naval Forces during World War II. In 1931, the old cruiser was expended as a target ship for aircraft and naval gunners. (Note: The ship's fate is also unclear, Silverstone says that she was discarded in 1936 and sunk in 1939. See Silverstone, p. 97, for further details.)

== Bibliography ==
- Callo, Joseph F.; Wilson, Alastair (2004). Who's Who in Naval History: From 1550 to the Present. London: Routledge. ISBN 113439540X.
- Chamberlin, William Henry (2014). The Russian Revolution, Volume II: 1918-1921: From the Civil War to the Consolidation of Power. Princeton: Princeton University Press. ISBN 9781400858705.
- Chesneau, Roger & Kolesnik, Eugene M., eds. (1979). Conway's All the World's Fighting Ships 1860–1905. Greenwich: Conway Maritime Press. ISBN 0-8317-0302-4.
- Corbett, Julian Stafford (1920). Naval Operations: To The Battle of the Falklands, December 1914. Vol. I. London: Longmans, Green & Co. OCLC 873379826.
- Dai, Wei (September 2020). "A Discussion on French Armored Cruiser Identification: From the Gueydon Class to the Edgar Quinet Class". Warship International. LVII (3): 199–221. ISSN 0043-0374.
- Earle, Ralph, ed. (1912). Proceedings. 38 (1). Annapolis: United States Naval Institute.
- Gardiner, Robert & Gray, Randal, eds. (1985). Conway's All the World's Fighting Ships 1906–1921. Annapolis: Naval Institute Press. ISBN 0-87021-907-3.
- Ingersoll, R. E. (1898). "Organization of the Fleet for War". Proceedings of the United States Naval Institute. 39 (4). Annapolis: Naval Institute Press: 1379–1405.
- Jordan, John & Caresse, Philippe (2019). French Armoured Cruisers 1887–1932. Barnsley, UK: Seaforth Publishing. ISBN 978-1-5267-4118-9.
- Lauzanne, Stéphane (1918). Fighting France. Translated by John L. B. Williams. New York: D. Appleton & Co. OCLC 1172534.
- "New York Times Index: A Masterkey to All Newspapers". The New York Times. Vol. VI, no. 4. New York. 1916.
- Silverstone, Paul H. (1984). Directory of the World's Capital Ships. New York: Hippocrene Books. ISBN 0-88254-979-0.
- Smele, Jonothan D. (28 July 2016). The Russian Civil Wars 1916–1926. London: Hurst & Company. ISBN 978-1-84904-721-0.
- Sondhaus, Lawrence (2014). The Great War at Sea: A Naval History of the First World War. Cambridge: Cambridge University Press. ISBN 978-1-107-03690-1.
