= French destroyer Épée (1900) =

Destroyer of the French Navy

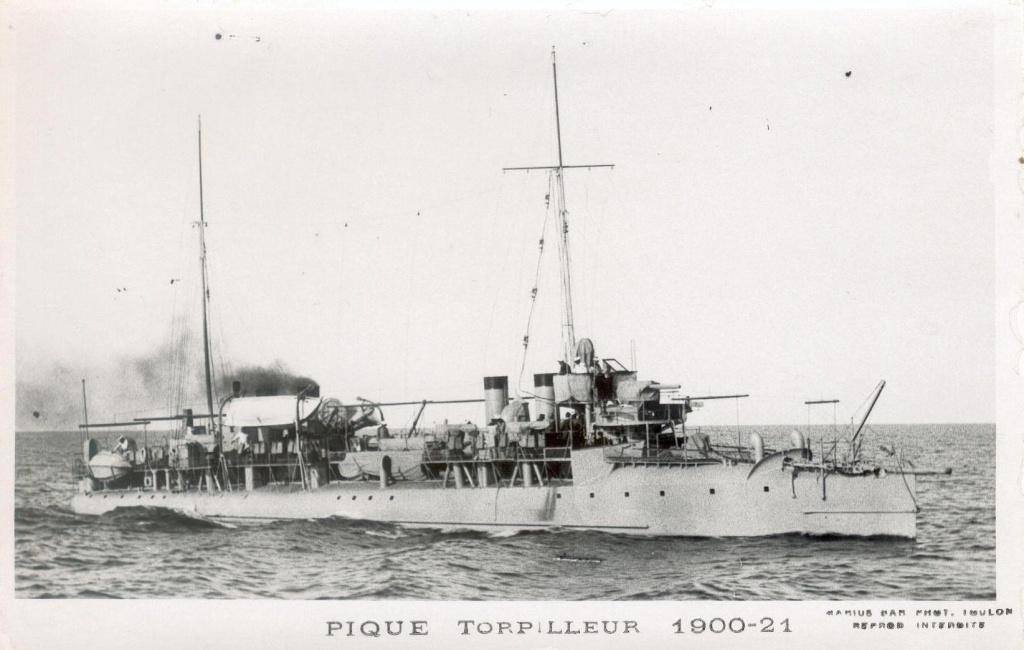
- Sister ship Pique

History

France
- Name: Epée
- Namesake: Épée
- Builder: Forges et Chantiers de la Méditerranée, Le Havre
- Laid down: 1897
- Launched: 27 July 1900
- Stricken: 1 October 1920
- Fate: Sold for scrap, 8 January 1921

General characteristics
- Class & type: Framée-class destroyer
- Displacement: 319 t (314 long tons)
- Length: 58.2 m (190 ft 11 in) o/a
- Beam: 6.31 m (20 ft 8 in)
- Draft: 3.03 m (9 ft 11 in)
- Installed power: 4 water-tube boilers; 4,800–5,200 ihp (3,600–3,900 kW)
- Propulsion: 2 shafts; 2 triple-expansion steam engines
- Speed: 26 knots (48 km/h; 30 mph)
- Range: 2,055 nmi (3,806 km; 2,365 mi) at 10 knots (19 km/h; 12 mph)
- Complement: 48
- Armament: 1 × single 65 mm (2.6 in) gun; 6 × single 47 mm (1.9 in) guns; 2 × single 381 mm (15 in) torpedo tubes

Épée was one of four Framée-class destroyers built for the French Navy around the beginning of the 20th century. During the First World War, the ship saw service in the Mediterranean Sea and survived the war to be stricken from the naval register on 1 October 1920.

== Design and description ==
The Framées had an overall length of 58.2 meters (190 ft 11 in), a beam of 6.31 meters (20 ft 8 in), and a maximum draft of 3.03 meters (9 ft 11 in). They displaced 319 metric tons (314 long tons) at deep load. The two triple-expansion steam engines, each driving one propeller shaft, produced a total of 4,200–5,200 indicated horsepower (3,132–3,878 kW), using steam provided by four water-tube boilers. The ships had a designed speed of 26 knots (48 km/h; 30 mph) and Épée reached a speed of 26.19 knots (48.50 km/h; 30.14 mph) during her sea trials on 1 July 1901. The ships carried enough coal to give them a range of 2,055 nautical miles (3,806 km; 2,365 mi) at 10 knots (19 km/h; 12 mph). Their complement consisted of four officers and forty-four enlisted men.

The Framée-class ships were armed with a single 65-millimeter (2.6 in) gun forward of the bridge and six 47-millimeter (1.9 in) Hotchkiss guns, three on each broadside. They were fitted with two single 381-millimeter (15 in) torpedo tubes, one between the funnels and the other on the stern. Two reload torpedoes were also carried.

== Construction and career ==
Épée was ordered from Forges et Chantiers de la Méditerranée on 27 October 1897 and was laid down on 126 May 1898 at its shipyard in Granville-Le Havre. The ship was launched on 27 July 1900 and conducted her sea trials in May–July. She was commissioned for her trials on 2 January and was later assigned to the Mediterranean Squadron.

When the First World War began in August 1914, Épée was one of the leaders (divisionnaire) in the 3rd Submarine Flotilla (3^{e} escadrille sous-marins) of the 2nd Light Squadron (2^{e} escadre légère), based at Cherbourg, although the ship was not ready for service.

== Bibliography ==
- Campbell, N. J. M. (1979). "France". In Chesneau, Roger & Kolesnik, Eugene M. (eds.). Conway's All the World's Fighting Ships 1860–1905. Greenwich: Conway Maritime Press. pp. 283–333. ISBN 0-8317-0302-4.
- Couhat, Jean Labayle (1974). French Warships of World War I. London: Ian Allan. ISBN 0-7110-0445-5.
- Prévoteaux, Gérard (2017). La marine française dans la Grande guerre: les combattants oubliés: Tome I 1914–1915 [The French Navy during the Great War: The Forgotten Combatants, Book I 1914–1915]. Collection Navires & Histoire des Marines du Mond. Vol. 23. Le Vigen, France: Éditions Lela presse. ISBN 978-2-37468-000-2.
- Prévoteaux, Gérard (2017). La marine française dans la Grande guerre: les combattants oubliés: Tome II 1916–1918 [The French Navy during the Great War: The Forgotten Combatants, Book II 1916–1918]. Collection Navires & Histoire des Marines du Mond. Vol. 27. Le Vigen, France: Éditions Lela presse. ISBN 978-2-37468-001-9.
- Roberts, Stephen S. (2021). French Warships in the Age of Steam 1859–1914: Design, Construction, Careers and Fates. Barnsley, UK: Seaforth Publishing. ISBN 978-1-5267-4533-0.
