= Framée-class destroyer =

Framée class
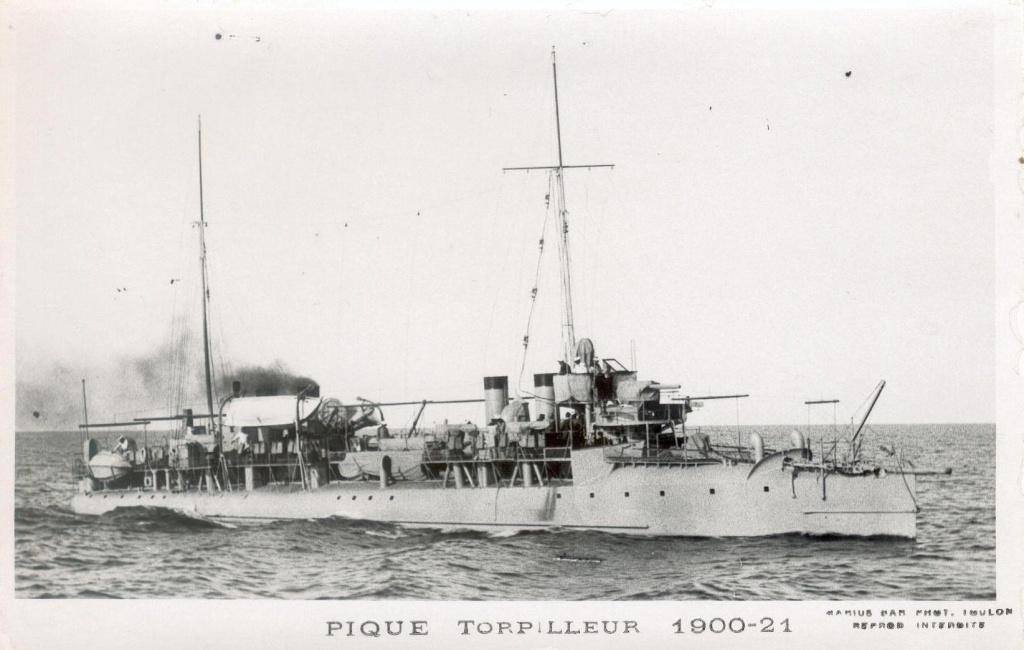
- Pique

Class overview
- Name: Framée class
- Operators: French Navy
- Preceded by: Durandal class
- Succeeded by: Rochefortais class
- Built: 1897–1901
- In service: 1900–1921
- Completed: 4
- Lost: 2
- Scrapped: 2

General characteristics
- Type: Destroyer
- Displacement: 319 t (314 long tons)
- Length: 58.2 m (190 ft 11 in) o/a
- Beam: 6.31 m (20 ft 8 in)
- Draft: 3.03 m (9 ft 11 in)
- Installed power: 4 water-tube boilers; 4,800–5,200 ihp (3,600–3,900 kW)
- Propulsion: 2 shafts; 2 triple-expansion steam engines
- Speed: 26 knots (48 km/h; 30 mph)
- Range: 2,055 nmi (3,806 km; 2,365 mi) at 10 knots (19 km/h; 12 mph)
- Complement: 48
- Armament: 1 × single 65 mm (2.6 in) gun; 6 × single 47 mm (1.9 in) guns; 2 × single 381 mm (15 in) torpedo tubes

The Framée class consisted of four destroyers built for the French Navy at the beginning of the 20th century. One ship was sunk in a collision shortly after completion, but the others served during the First World War. One ship was sunk in a collision with a British cargo ship in 1916, but the others survived the war to be discarded in 1920–1921.

== Design and description ==
The Framées had an overall length of 58.2 meters (190 ft 11 in), a beam of 6.31 meters (20 ft 8 in), and a maximum draft of 3.03 meters (9 ft 11 in). They displaced 319 metric tons (314 long tons) at deep load. The two triple-expansion steam engines, each driving one propeller shaft, produced a total of 4,200–5,200 indicated horsepower (3,132–3,878 kW), using steam provided by four water-tube boilers which exhausted through four funnels. The ships had a designed speed of 26 knots (48 km/h; 30 mph), but they reached 25.88–27.07 knots (47.93–50.13 km/h; 29.78–31.15 mph) during their sea trials. The ships carried up to 99 metric tons (97 long tons) of coal to give them a range of 2,055 nautical miles (3,806 km; 2,365 mi) at 10 knots (19 km/h; 12 mph). Their complement consisted of four officers and forty-four enlisted men.

The Framée-class ships were armed with a single 65-millimeter (2.6 in) gun forward of the bridge and six 47-millimeter (1.9 in) Hotchkiss guns, three on each broadside. They were fitted with two single 381-millimeter (15 in) torpedo tubes, one between the funnels and the other on the stern. Two reload torpedoes were also carried.

== Ships ==
Name	Builder	Launched	In service	Fate
Framée	Ateliers et Chantiers de la Loire, Nantes	October 21, 1899	June 20, 1900	Sunk August 11, 1900
Yatagan	Ateliers et Chantiers de la Loire, Nantes	July 20, 1900	October 1900	Sunk November 3, 1916
Pique	Forges et Chantiers de la Méditerranée Le Havre	March 31, 1900	June 1901	Struck January 28, 1921; Scrapped, 1921
Épée	Forges et Chantiers de la Méditerranée Le Havre	July 27, 1900	August 1901	Struck October 1, 1920; Scrapped, 1921

== Bibliography ==
- Campbell, N. J. M. (1979). "France". In Chesneau, Roger & Kolesnik, Eugene M. (eds.). Conway's All the World's Fighting Ships 1860–1905. Greenwich: Conway Maritime Press. pp. 283–333. ISBN 0-8317-0302-4.
- Couhat, Jean Labayle (1974). French Warships of World War I. London: Ian Allan. ISBN 0-7110-0445-5.
- Osborne, Eric W. (2005). Destroyers - An Illustrated History of Their Impact. Santa Barbara, California: ABC-Clio. ISBN 1-85109-479-2.
- Jordan, John (2025). "The 300-Tonnes: The First French Torpedo Boat Destroyer". In Jordan, John (ed.). Warship 2025. London: Bloomsbury Publishing. pp. 111–132. ISBN 978-1-4728-6854-1.
- Prévoteaux, Gérard (2017). La marine française dans la Grande guerre: les combattants oubliés: Tome I 1914–1915 [The French Navy during the Great War: The Forgotten Combatants, Book I 1914–1915]. Collection Navires & Histoire des Marines du Mond. Vol. 23. Le Vigen, France: Éditions Lela presse. ISBN 978-2-37468-000-2.
- Prévoteaux, Gérard (2017). La marine française dans la Grande guerre: les combattants oubliés: Tome II 1916–1918 [The French Navy during the Great War: The Forgotten Combatants, Book II 1916–1918]. Collection Navires & Histoire des Marines du Mond. Vol. 27. Le Vigen, France: Éditions Lela presse. ISBN 978-2-37468-001-9.
- Roberts, Stephen S. (2021). French Warships in the Age of Steam 1859–1914: Design, Construction, Careers and Fates. Barnsley, UK: Seaforth Publishing. ISBN 978-1-5267-4533-0.
