= María Júlía =

Coast guard vessel

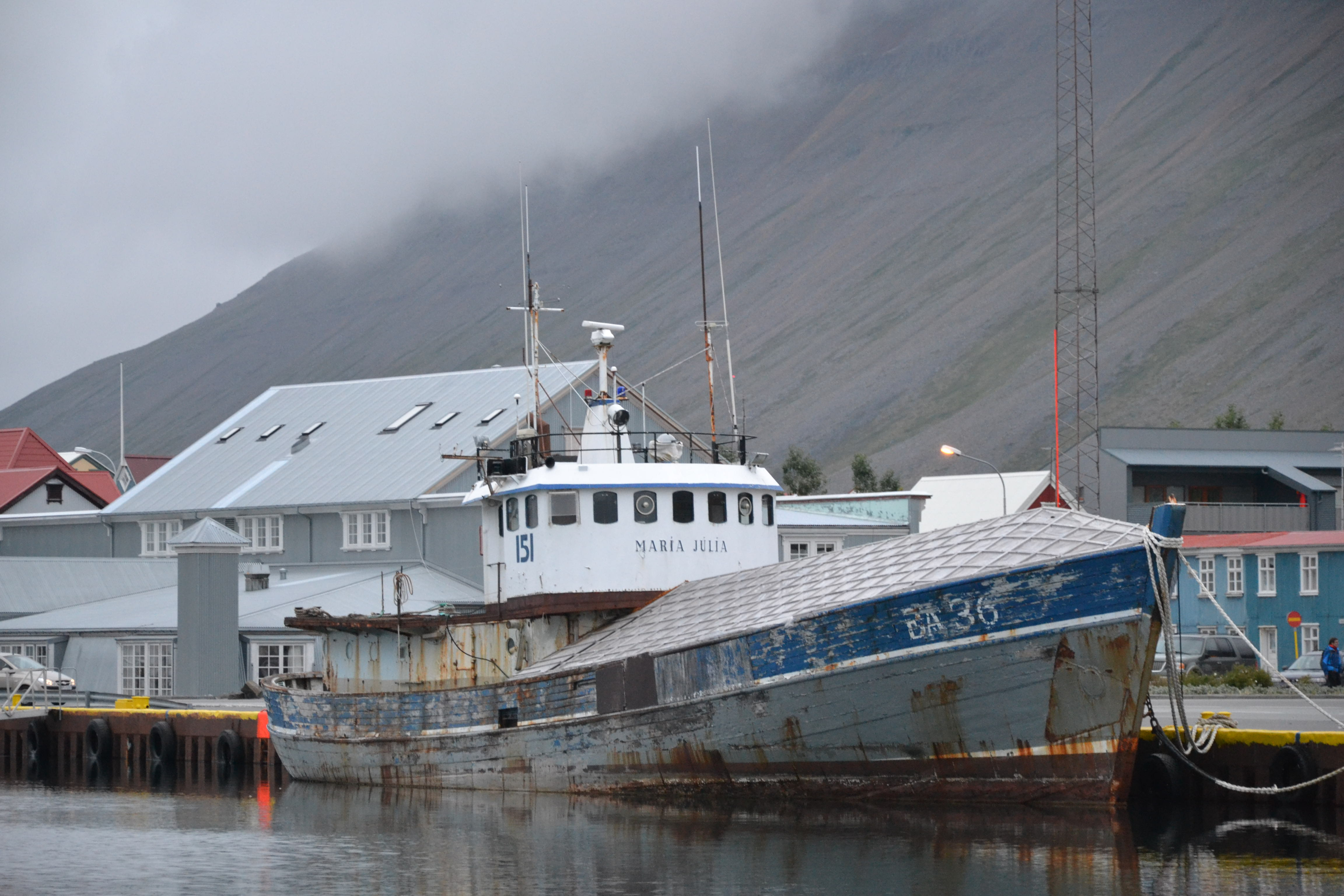
- María Júlía in Ísafjörður harbour in 2012

History

Iceland
- Name: María Júlía
- Namesake: María Júlía Gísladóttir
- Commissioned: 1950
- Decommissioned: 1969
- Fate: Museum ship

General characteristics
- Displacement: 137 t
- Length: 27.5 m (90 ft)
- Armament: 47 mm cannon

María Júlía is a former coast guard vessel, operated by Icelandic Coast Guard from 1950 to 1969 as a rescue, research and patrol ship. It served in the first Cod Wars conflict between Iceland and the United Kingdom from 1958 to 1961. It is estimated that the ship's crew rescued about 2,000 people during its service with the Coast Guard.

The ship was built of oak in Frederikssund in Denmark and cost 1.5 million ISK, about 300,000 of which was a contribution from search and rescue units in the Westfjords. The ship was named after María Júlía Gísladóttir from Ísafjörður, who in 1937 provided substantial funding for the construction of a rescue ship. The ship was equipped with a laboratory for fish scientists and for surveying and was the first marine research vessel in Iceland. It was armed with a 47 mm cannon.

In 1969, the Coast Guard sold the ship, and in the following years it operated as a fishing vessel and from Patreksfjörður and Tálknafjörður. It was intended to be sold to South Africa, but in 2003 the Egils Ólafsson Museum in Hnjótur and the Westfjords Regional Museum bought the ship with the aim of repairing and operating it as a museum ship that could sail between locations in the Westfjords. In 2006 the ship was moved to Patreksfjörður for repairs and the following year to Bolungarvík and then to Þingeyri.

María Júlía is 137 tons, 27.5 meters long and 3.25 meters deep.

In 2018, the chairman of the Ísafjarðarbær Planning and Infrastructure Committee, Sigurður J. Hreinsson, suggested that the ship be sunk at a shallow depth as it would be accessible for scuba divers.

In June 2022, the government of Iceland approved a proposal by the Prime Minister and the Minister for the Environment, Energy and Climate to provide 15 million ISK for repairs of the ship. In March 2023, the ship was towed by ICGV Þór to Akureyri for repairs.
