= French cruiser Jules Michelet =

Armoured cruiser of the French Navy

Jules Michelet
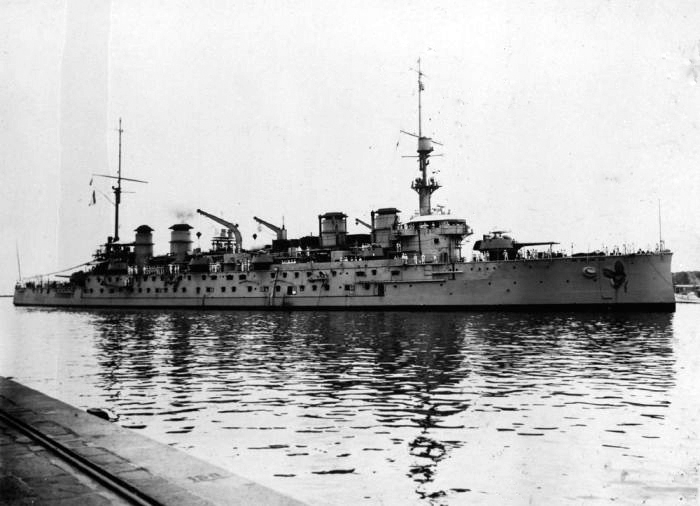
- Jules Michelet at Tanjung Priok, Dutch East Indies, while serving as transport for the Governor-General of Indochina, 1929

Class overview
- Operators: French Navy
- Preceded by: Léon Gambetta class
- Succeeded by: Ernest Renan

History
- Name: Jules Michelet
- Namesake: Jules Michelet
- Builder: Lorient
- Laid down: June 1904
- Launched: 31 August 1905
- Commissioned: November 1908
- Fate: Sank as target 1937

General characteristics
- Type: Armoured cruiser
- Displacement: 13,105 t (12,898 long tons)
- Length: 146.53 m (480 ft 9 in) overall
- Beam: 21.41 m (70 ft 3 in)
- Draught: 8.41 m (27 ft 7 in)
- Propulsion: 3 vertical triple expansion steam engines, 28 Guyot du Temple boilers, 30,000 ihp (22,371 kW)
- Speed: 22.5 knots (41.7 km/h; 25.9 mph)
- Capacity: 2,070 tonnes of coal
- Complement: 728
- Armament: 4 × 194 mm (7.6 in) guns in twin turrets; 12 × 164 mm (6.5 in)/45 M1893-96M guns in eight single turrets and four casemates; 24 × 47 mm (3-pounder) guns in single mountings; 2 × 450 mm (17.7 in) submerged torpedo tubes
- Armour: Belt: 71–152 mm (2.8–6 in); 193 mm turrets: 200 mm (8 in); 164 mm turrets: 130–170 mm (5.1–6.5 in); Casemates: 140 mm (5.5 in); Conning tower: 200 mm (8 in)

Jules Michelet was an armoured cruiser of the French Navy, laid down in 1904 and completed in 1908. It was a development of the Léon Gambetta class of armoured cruisers, and was the sole representative of its type. It served during the First World War being eventually sunk as a target in 1937.

== Description ==
Jules Michelet was laid down in June 1904 as a modified version of the Leon Gambetta class class of armoured cruisers. It was slightly longer and heavier than the previous class, and while it had a similar machinery layout, with 28 boilers supplying vertical triple-expansion steam engines which drove three propeller shafts, the engines delivered 1,500 ihp (1,100 kW) more power, allowing the ship to reach a design speed of 22.5 knots (41.7 km/h; 25.9 mph). The ship was fitted with four funnels.

The main armament was four 194 mm (7.6 in) guns in twin turrets, one each fore and aft, while secondary armament was twelve 164 mm (6.5 in) guns, eight of which were in single turrets and the remaining four in casemates. Although Jules Michelet had four fewer 164 mm guns than the Leon Gambetta class, with single turrets instead of twin turrets, both the main and secondary guns were more powerful models than those carried in the earlier ships. A tertiary anti-torpedo-boat battery of twenty four 47 mm (1.9 in) guns was mounted in casemates. The ship's armament was completed by two submerged 450 mm (17.7 in) torpedo tubes.

== History ==
The ship was launched in August 1905 and completed in November 1908, reaching a speed of 22.9 knots (42.4 km/h; 26.4 mph) in trials.

After entering service, Jules Michelet was assigned to the cruiser squadron of the Mediterranean Fleet, based in Toulon. On 27 June 1912, Jules Michelet suffered two gun explosions during firing practice at Toulon, killing four and wounding 21. These explosions were blamed on defective powder.

=== World War I ===
During the First World War, Jules Michelet was part of the Mediterranean Fleet, spending the whole of the war in the Mediterranean. At the start of the conflict, Jules Michelet and the armored cruisers Ernest Renan and Edgar Quinet were mobilized as the First Light Division and tasked with hunting down the German battlecruiser SMS Goeben and the light cruiser Breslau. The French ships, along with a flotilla of twelve destroyers, were to steam to Philippeville on 4 August, but the German cruisers had bombarded the port the previous day. This attack, coupled with reports that suggested the Germans would try to break out of the Mediterranean into the Atlantic, prompted the French high command to send Jules Michelet and the First Light Division further west, to Algiers to block the Germans.

After the German ships escaped to Constantinople, rather than attack the French troop transports from North Africa as had been expected, the French turned to address the next naval threat: the Austro-Hungarian Navy in the Adriatic Sea. Edgar Quinet joined the rest of the French fleet in its blockade of the Adriatic, based out of Navarino. The fleet, commanded by Admiral Augustin Boué de Lapeyrère, had assembled by the night of 15 August; the following morning, it conducted a sweep into the Adriatic and encountered the Austro-Hungarian cruiser SMS Zenta. In the ensuing Battle of Antivari, Zenta was sunk, with no losses on the French side. The French fleet then withdrew due to the threat of Austro-Hungarian U-boats in the area.

Twelve of Jules Michelet's 47 mm guns were removed during the war, replaced by four anti-aircraft guns of similar size. She took place in the evacuation of the Serbian army from Corfu to Bizerta in 1915 and later supported Allied operations in the Salonika campaign. Following the signing of the Armistice of Mudros, ending the participation of Turkey in the First World War, Jules Michelet was deployed through the Dardanelles into the Black Sea in November 1918.

=== Later career ===
Jules Michelet went on a brief tour of French Indochina in 1922–1923 with the armoured cruiser Victor Hugo. The pair left France on 12 October 1922, arriving on 19 April 1923. They cruised East Asian waters until 10 May when they departed for France, which they reached on 11 July. Jules Michelet was deployed to Indochina for a lengthier stay as the flagship of the Far East squadron in the late 1920s; she left France on 15 June 1925 and arrived in July. She remained there until May 1929, when she was replaced by Waldeck-Rousseau. Jules Michelet returned to France on 10 July 1929, after which she was paid off and placed in reserve. She was disarmed the following year and was used as a barracks ship at Toulon. The ship was later used as a target ship for aircraft and submarines, being sunk by the submarine Thétis in 1937.
