= Canon de 194 mm Modèle 1902 gun =

Canon de 194 mm Modèle 1902
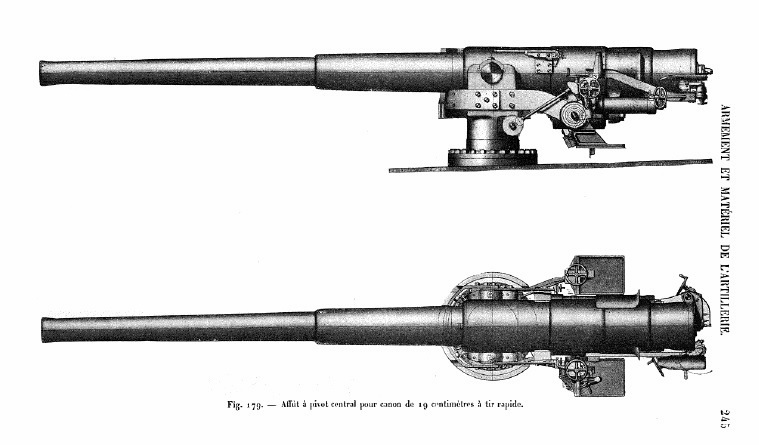
- A Canon de 194 mm Modèle 1902 on a center pivot mount
- Type: Naval gun Coastal artillery
- Place of origin: France

Service history
- In service: 1902—1945
- Used by: France
- Wars: World War I World War II

Production history
- Designed: 1902

Specifications
- Mass: 15 t (17 short tons)
- Length: 10.1 meters (33 ft)
- Barrel length: 9.7 meters (32 ft) 50 caliber
- Shell: separate-loading, bagged charge
- Shell weight: 89.5 kg (197 lb)
- Caliber: 194 mm (7.6 in)
- Elevation: -6° to +15°
- Traverse: Turrets: -150° to +150° Casemates: -80 to +80°
- Rate of fire: 2 rpm
- Muzzle velocity: 940 m/s (3,100 ft/s)
- Maximum firing range: 26 km (16 mi) at 45°

The Canon de 194 mm Modèle 1902 was a medium-caliber naval gun used as the primary or secondary armament in both casemates and turrets of a number of French pre-dreadnoughts and armored cruisers during World War I. After World War I these ships were scrapped and some were later reused as coastal artillery in World War II

== Naval service ==
Ship classes that carried the Canon de 194 mm Modèle 1902 include:

- Edgar Quinet-class cruisers - The two ships of this class were armed with fourteen guns. Four were in twin turrets forward and aft, three were in single gun turrets on each side. The last four guns were mounted in casemates amidships.
- Cruiser Ernest Renan - The primary armament of this ship consisted of four guns mounted in twin turrets fore and aft.
- Cruiser Jules Michelet - The primary armament of this ship consisted of four guns mounted in twin turrets fore and aft.
- Liberté-class - The secondary armament of this class consisted of ten guns. Three were mounted in single turrets on each side of the ship and four were in casemates amidships.

== Gallery ==
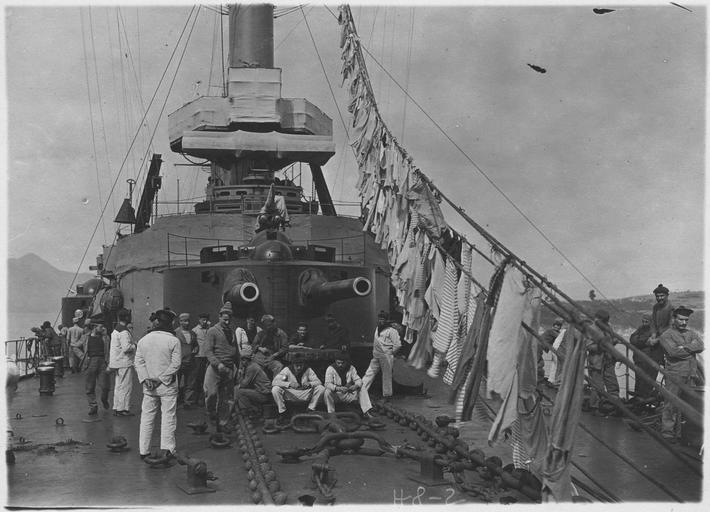
A twin turret aboard the French Cruiser Waldeck-Rousseau off Corfu.

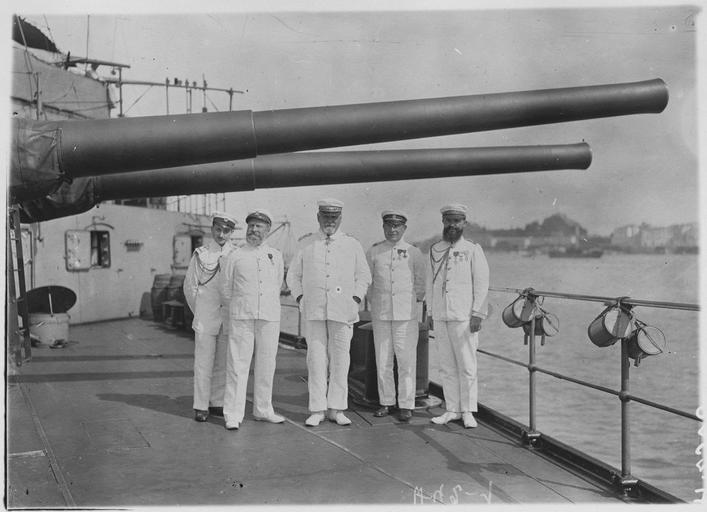
Officers aboard the French Cruiser Waldeck-Rousseau.

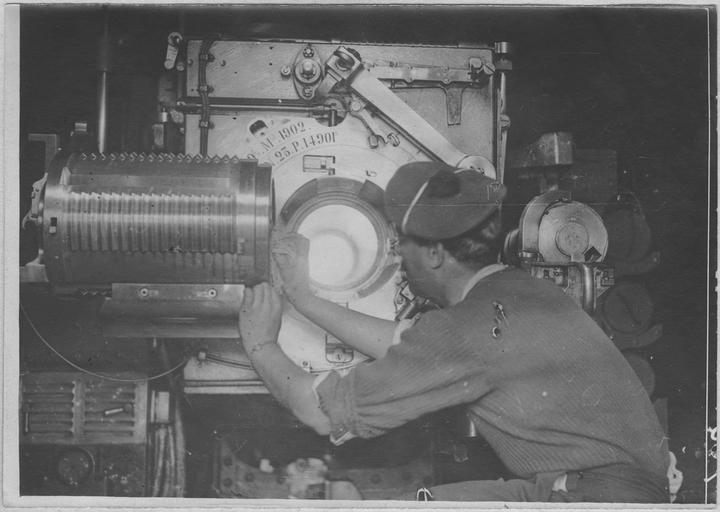
The breech of a Canon de 194 mm Modèle 1902.
