= QF 3-pounder Hotchkiss =

Light 47 mm naval gun introduced in 1886

Hotchkiss 47 mm L/40 M1885 & QF 3-pounder
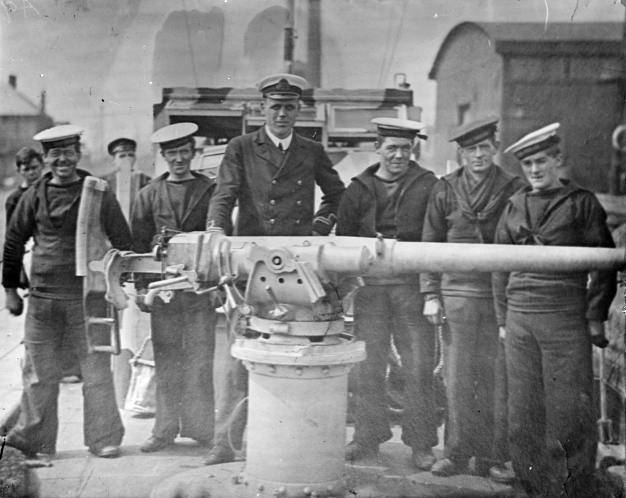
- A Royal Navy 3-pounder gun on a central pivot mount in 1915.
- Type: Naval gun Anti-aircraft gun Coastal artillery
- Place of origin: France

Service history
- In service: 1886–1950s
- Used by: See users section
- Wars: See wars section

Production history
- Designer: Hotchkiss
- Designed: 1885
- Manufacturer: Hotchkiss et Cie
- Produced: 1886
- No. built: 2,950 (UK)
- Variants: 32 to 50 calibers in length

Specifications
- Mass: 240 kg (530 lb)
- Length: 2 m (6 ft 7 in)
- Barrel length: 1.8 m (5 ft 11 in) 40 caliber
- Shell: Fixed QF 47 × 376 mm R Complete: 3 kg (6.6 lb); Projectile: 1.5 kg (3.3 lb)
- Calibre: 47 mm (1.9 in)
- Breech: Vertical sliding-wedge
- Elevation: Dependent on mount
- Rate of fire: 30 rpm
- Muzzle velocity: 571 m/s (1,870 ft/s)
- Maximum firing range: 5.9 km (3.7 mi) at +20° 4.5 km (2.8 mi) at +80°

The QF 3-pounder Hotchkiss or in French use Canon Hotchkiss à tir rapide de 47 mm were a family of long-lived light 47 mm naval guns introduced in 1886 to defend against new, small and fast vessels such as torpedo boats and later submarines. There were many variants produced, often under license, which ranged in length from 32 to 50 calibers but 40 caliber was the most common version. They were widely used by the navies of a number of nations and often used by both sides in a conflict. They were also used ashore as coastal defense guns and later as an anti-aircraft gun, on either improvised or specialized HA/LA mounts.

== Operational history ==
=== French service ===
Hotchkiss 47 mm L/50 M1902
- Type: Naval gun
- Place of origin: France

Service history
- Used by: France
- Wars: World War I

Production history
- Designer: Hotchkiss et Cie
- Designed: 1902
- Manufacturer: Hotchkiss et Cie
- Produced: 1902

Specifications
- Mass: 594 kg (1,310 lb)
- Length: 2.85 m (9 ft 4 in)
- Barrel length: 2.35 m (7 ft 9 in) 50 caliber
- Shell: Complete: 4 kg (8.8 lb); Projectile: 2 kg (4.4 lb)
- Caliber: 47 mm (1.9 in)
- Breech: Vertical sliding wedge
- Rate of fire: 25 rpm
- Muzzle velocity: 690 m/s (2,300 ft/s)

The French Navy used two versions of the Hotchkiss 3-pounder: the short-barreled 40-caliber M1885 and the long-barreled 50-caliber M1902, which had a larger muzzle velocity than its predecessor. The French L/40 M1885 and the British QF 3-pounder were largely the same gun. Like the British who paired their 3-pounders with the larger QF 6-pounder Hotchkiss the French often paired theirs with the Canon de 65 mm Modèle 1891 sometimes called a 9-pounder in English publications. The 3-pounder was primarily used as anti-torpedo boat defense aboard armored cruisers, destroyers, ironclads, pre-dreadnought battleships, protected cruisers and submarines. During World War I, the role of the guns changed from anti-torpedo boat defense to anti-aircraft defense and new high angle mounts were developed but were found to be ineffective.

The Liberté-class and Danton-class battleships mounted the gun, in addition to the cruisers Jules Michelet, Ernest Renan, and those of the Edgar Quinet-class. It was used as the standard French shipboard anti-aircraft gun during World War I, being replaced by the Canon de 75 mm modèle 1908.

After World War I the majority of 3-pounders in the anti-aircraft role were replaced with either the anti-aircraft version of the Canon de 75 modèle 1897 or the Canon de 75 mm modèle 1924. French ships armed with the L/40 M1885 and L/50 M1902 include:

- Amiral Charner-class cruisers
- Amphitrite-class submarines
- Arquebuse-class destroyers
- Bouvines-class coast defense ships
- Branlebas-class destroyers
- Bretagne-class battleships
- Charlemagne-class battleships
- Claymore-class destroyers
- Clorinde-class submarines
- Courbet-class battleships
- Danton-class battleships
- D'Estrées-class cruisers
- Dupleix-class cruisers
- Dupuy de Lôme-class submarines
- Durandal-class destroyers
- Framee-class destroyers
- Gloire-class cruisers
- Gueydon-class cruisers
- Gustave Zédé-class submarines
- Jemmapes-class ironclads
- Leon Gambetta-class cruisers
- Liberte-class battleships
- Marceau-class ironclads
- Normandie-class battleships
- O'Byrne-class submarines
- Pertuisane-class destroyers
- Republique-class battleships
- Tonnerre-class ironclads
- French ironclad Amiral Baudin
- French battleship Brennus
- French battleship Carnot
- French battleship Charles Martel
- French cruiser Guichen

=== Australian service ===
A 3-pounder Hotchkiss was used on an improvised mounting in a battle that resulted in Australia's first prisoners of World War 2 being captured near Berbera in 1940. The guns are now used in a Three Pound Saluting Gun Battery at the Garden Island Naval Base.

=== Austro-Hungarian service ===
Skoda 47mm SFK L/33 H
- Type: Naval gun
- Place of origin: France

Service history
- Used by: Austria-Hungary
- Wars: World War I

Production history
- Designer: Hotchkiss et Cie
- Designed: 1890
- Manufacturer: Skoda
- Produced: 1890

Specifications
- Mass: Gun: 133 kg (293 lb); Gun & Mount: 530 kg (1,170 lb)
- Length: 1.55 m (5 ft 1 in) 33 caliber
- Shell: Projectile: 1.1 kg (2.4 lb)
- Caliber: 47 mm (1.9 in)
- Breech: Vertical sliding wedge
- Elevation: -15° to +20°
- Traverse: 360°
- Rate of fire: 25 rpm
- Muzzle velocity: 560 m/s (1,800 ft/s)
- Maximum firing range: 3 km (1.9 mi)

Skoda 47mm SFK L/44 S
- Type: Naval gun
- Place of origin: France

Service history
- Used by: Austria-Hungary
- Wars: World War I

Production history
- Designer: Hotchkiss et Cie
- Designed: 1897
- Manufacturer: Skoda
- Produced: 1897

Specifications
- Mass: Gun: 256 kg (564 lb); Gun & Mount: 790 kg (1,740 lb)
- Length: 2.048 m (6 ft 8.6 in) 44 caliber
- Shell: Projectile: 1.53 kg (3.4 lb)
- Caliber: 47 mm (1.9 in)
- Breech: Vertical sliding wedge
- Elevation: -10° to +20°
- Traverse: 360°
- Rate of fire: 25 rpm
- Muzzle velocity: 710 m/s (2,300 ft/s)
- Maximum firing range: 4 km (2.5 mi)

The Austro-Hungarian Navy used two versions of the Hotchkiss 3-pounder. The first was the short 47 mm SFK L/33 H of 1890 produced under license by Skoda. The second was the long 47 mm SFK L/44 S of 1897 produced under license by Skoda. These two guns were the primary rapid fire anti-torpedo boat guns of many ships built or refitted between 1890 and 1918. On 16 August 1914 at the Battle of Antivari, the Austro-Hungarian protected cruiser SMS Zenta was sunk by a combined Anglo-French force. Both sides in the battle were armed with Hotchkiss guns.

Austro-Hungarian ships armed with the L/33 and L/44 include:

- Erzherzog Karl-class battleships
- Habsburg-class battleships
- Huszár-class destroyers
- Kaiman-class torpedo boats
- Kaiser Franz Joseph I-class cruisers
- Monarch-class coastal defense ships
- Panther-class cruisers
- Radetzky-class battleships
- U-10-class submarines
- SMS Boa
- SMS Kaiser Karl VI
- SMS Kaiserin und Königin Maria Theresia
- SMS Kronprinz Erzherzog Rudolf
- SMS Kronprinzessin Erzherzogin Stephanie
- SMS Sankt Georg
- Zenta-class cruisers

=== Chinese service ===
China adopted the Hotchkiss 3-pounder in the 1880s, to arm its cruisers and smaller auxiliaries; the Hai Yung-class cruisers of the Imperial Chinese Navy built by AG Vulcan Stettin were armed with Nordenfelt 3-pounder guns firing the same ammunition. During the First Sino-Japanese War, ships of both sides were armed with Hotchkiss 3-pounder guns.

Chinese ships armed with 3-pounder guns include:

- Chao Ho-class cruisers
- Yongfeng-class coastal defense ships
- Zhiyuen-class cruisers
- Chinese cruiser Hai Chi
- Chinese cruiser Jingyuan
- Chinese cruiser Laiyuan

=== Italian service ===
Italy adopted the Hotchkiss 3-pounder in the 1880s to arm its armored cruisers, battleships, protected cruisers, torpedo boats and torpedo cruisers. Ships on both sides of the Italo-Turkish War were armed with 3-pounder guns. The Italians carried Hotchkiss and Vickers guns, while the Ottoman Navy carried Nordenfelt guns.

Italian ships armed with 3-pounder guns include:

- Folgore-class cruisers
- Giuseppe Garibaldi-class cruisers
- Pegaso-class torpedo boats
- Regina Elena-class battleships
- Regina Margherita-class battleships
- Italian cruiser Tripoli

=== Japanese service ===
Hotchkiss 2½ Pounder Yamanouchi Mk I
- Type: Naval gun
- Place of origin: France

Service history
- Used by: Empire of Japan
- Wars: Russo-Japanese War

Production history
- Designer: Hotchkiss et Cie
- Designed: 1894
- Manufacturer: Elswick Ordnance Company
- Produced: 1894
- No. built: 253
- Variants: Elswick: Mk I, Mk II, Mk III; Yamanouchi: Mk I

Specifications
- Mass: 127 kg (280 lb)
- Length: 1.55 m (5 ft 1 in)
- Barrel length: 1.4 m (4 ft 7 in) 30 caliber
- Shell: Fixed QF 47 × 131R; Projectile: 1.12 kg (2.5 lb)
- Caliber: 47 mm (1.9 in)
- Breech: Vertical sliding wedge
- Muzzle velocity: 432 m/s (1,420 ft/s)

Japan adopted the Hotchkiss 3-pounder 5-barrel revolving cannon in the 1880s and later adopted the simpler single-barrel quick-firing weapon. The Japanese versions of the 3-pounder were known as Yamanouchi guns and were largely identical to their British equivalents. The Japanese also had a related 30 caliber 2½-pounder gun from Elswick, the Yamanouchi Mk I. During the Russo-Japanese War, ships of both sides were armed with Hotchkiss 3-pounder guns. The Japanese found them to be ineffective and removed them after the war.

Japanese ships armed with 3-pounder guns include:

- Asama-class cruisers
- Fuji-class battleships
- Kasagi-class cruisers
- Kasuga-class cruisers
- Katori-class battleships
- Kongō-class ironclads
- Matsushima-class cruisers
- Niitaka-class cruisers
- Shikishima-class battleships
- Suma-class cruisers
- Tsukuba-class cruisers
- Japanese battleship Asahi
- Japanese battleship Mikasa
- Japanese cruiser Akitsushima
- Japanese cruiser Azuma
- Japanese cruiser Chihaya
- Japanese cruiser Chiyoda
- Japanese cruiser Miyako
- Japanese cruiser Soya
- Japanese cruiser Takasago
- Japanese cruiser Tatsuta (1894)
- Japanese cruiser Yaeyama
- Japanese cruiser Yakumo
- Japanese cruiser Yoshino
- Japanese gunboat Oshima
- Japanese ironclad Fusō
- Japanese submarine tender Karasaki

=== Polish service ===
Polish 47 mm Hotchkiss guns named the wz.1885 gun, were used on first ships of the Polish Navy, received after World War I, like ex-German torpedo boats and minesweepers. By the time of World War II most had been replaced on naval ships but several stored guns were used in combat on improvised stationary mounts by Land Coastal Defence units in the Battle of Kępa Oksywska in September 1939.

=== Romanian service ===
The Romanian Navy used the Škoda-produced version of the gun. The gun was used as secondary and later tertiary armament on the Romanian monitors of the Brătianu-class. It also served as the main armament of the Căpitan Nicolae Lascăr Bogdan-class of armored multi-purpose boats, each of the 8 boats carrying one gun.

=== Icelandic service ===
The Icelandic Coast Guard received the QF 3-pounder model 1909 from Denmark and used it on its smaller patrol ships like María Júlía and on more temporary ships during the cod wars. The Icelandic Coast Guard retired it with the ICGV Þór (1951) in 1985

Icelandic ships known to have 3-pounder guns include:

- ICGV Þór (1951)
- María Júlía
- ICGV baldur

=== Russian service ===
47 mm L/43 Hotchkiss
- Type: Naval gun
- Place of origin: France

Service history
- Used by: Russian Empire
- Wars: Russo-Japanese War; World War I Russian Civil War

Production history
- Designer: Hotchkiss et Cie
- Designed: 1883
- Manufacturer: Obukhov State Plant
- Produced: 1888

Specifications
- Mass: Gun: 235 kg (518 lb)
- Length: 2 m (6 ft 7 in)
- Barrel length: 1.5 m (4 ft 11 in) 43 caliber
- Shell: Projectile: 1.53 kg (3.4 lb)
- Caliber: 47 mm (1.9 in)
- Breech: Vertical sliding wedge
- Elevation: -23° to +25°
- Traverse: 360°
- Rate of fire: 25 rpm
- Muzzle velocity: 701 m/s (2,300 ft/s)
- Maximum firing range: 4.5 km (2.8 mi) at 10°

Russia adopted the Hotchkiss 3-pounder 5-barrel revolving cannon in the 1880s, and later adopted the less complicated single-barrel 43 caliber quick-firing weapon. The 5-barrel guns were equipped on the Ekaterina II-class battleships commissioned in 1889 but by 1892 the battleship Dvenadsat Apostolov and her successors had single-barrel weapons. In 1888 licensed production of a Russian variant started at the Obukhov State Plant. During the Russo-Japanese War, ships of both sides were armed with Hotchkiss 3-pounders, which were found to be ineffective against Japanese torpedo boats and were removed from first-line warships after the war. The Evstafi class, commissioned in 1910 ceased carrying the weapon but they were later fitted to patrol vessels and river craft during World War I and at least 62 weapons were converted to anti-aircraft guns by 1917.

Russian ships armed with 3-pounder guns include:

- Admiral Ushakov-class coastal defense ships
- Amur-class minelayers
- Bayan-class cruisers
- Bogatyr-class cruisers
- Borodino-class battleships
- Derzky-class destroyers
- Izumrud-class cruisers
- Peresvet-class battleships
- Petropavlovsk-class battleships
- Russian battleship Navarin
- Russian battleship Potemkin
- Russian battleship Retvizan
- Russian battleship Rostislav
- Russian battleship Sissoi Veliky
- Russian battleship Tri Sviatitelia
- Russian battleship Tsesarevich
- Russian cruiser Admiral Kornilov
- Russian cruiser Admiral Nakhimov (1885)
- Russian cruiser Almaz
- Russian cruiser Askold
- Russian cruiser Boyarin
- Russian cruiser Gromoboi
- Russian cruiser Pamiat Azova
- Russian cruiser Rossia
- Russian cruiser Rurik (1892)
- Russian cruiser Rurik (1906)
- Russian cruiser Svetlana
- Russian cruiser Varyag
- Russian cruiser Vladimir Monomakh
- Russian yacht Standart

=== United Kingdom service ===
In 1886 this gun was the first modern Quick-firing (QF) artillery piece to be adopted by the Royal Navy. It was known as the Ordnance QF 3 pounder Hotchkiss and was built under licence by the Elswick Ordnance Company.

By the middle of World War I the Hotchkiss gun was obsolescent and was gradually replaced by the more powerful Ordnance QF 3 pounder Vickers gun. Of the 2,950 produced it is estimated that 1,948 were still available in 1939 for RN use. The availability, simplicity and light weight of the gun kept it in use in small vessels and many were later brought back into service on merchant vessels used for auxiliary duties in World War II or as saluting guns and sub-calibre guns for gunnery practice until the 1950s. Early in WWII, it was also pressed into service in ports around the British Empire, to defend against possible incursions by motor torpedo boats, until the modern QF 6 pounder 10 cwt gun became available. Two, brought from Gibraltar in the late 1990s, are still in use on Victory Green in the Falkland Islands for saluting purposes.

Royal Navy ships armed with QF 3-pounder Hotchkiss guns included:

- Admiral-class ironclads
- Adventure-class cruisers
- Alert-class sloops
- Arrogant-class cruisers
- Astraea-class cruisers
- Blake-class cruisers
- Bramble-class gunboats
- C-class cruisers
- Cadmus-class sloops
- Canopus-class battleships
- Centurion-class battleships
- Challenger-class cruisers
- Colossus-class battleships
- Condor-class sloops
- Conqueror-class monitors
- Cressy-class cruisers
- Cyclops-class monitors
- Devastation-class ironclads
- Devonshire-class cruisers
- Diadem-class cruisers
- Drake-class cruisers
- Duncan-class battleships
- Eclipse-class cruisers
- Formidable-class battleships
- Forward-class cruisers
- Gorgon-class monitors
- Highflyer-class cruisers
- King Edward VII-class battleships
- King George V-class battleships
- Lord Nelson-class battleships
- Majestic-class battleships
- Marathon-class cruisers
- Monarch-class coastal defense ships
- Monmouth-class cruisers
- Orion-class battleships
- Orlando-class cruisers
- Pathfinder-class cruisers
- Pearl-class cruisers
- Pelorus-class cruisers
- Phoenix-class sloops
- Powerful-class cruisers
- Redbreast-class gunboats
- Royal Sovereign-class battleships
- Sentinel-class cruisers
- Topaze-class cruisers
- Trafalgar-class ironclads

=== United States service ===
Manufacturer	Manufacturers Designation	US Designation	Caliber
Hotchkiss	Mk I	Mk I	40
Driggs-Schroeder	Mk I	Mk II	45
Driggs-Schroeder	Mk II (trunnionless)	Mk III	45
Hotchkiss	Mk IV semi-automatic	Mk IV	45
Maxim-Nordenfelt	Mk I semi-automatic	Mk V	50
Maxim-Nordenfelt	Mk II semi-automatic	Mk VI	50
Vickers-Maxim	Mk III semi-automatic	Mk VII	45
Hotchkiss-Armstrong	?	Mk VIII	40
Nordenfelt	Mk I	Mk IX	42
Hotchkiss	?	Mk X	50
US Rapid Fire Gun and Power Company	?	Mk XI	50
Nordenfelt	Mk I semi-automatic	Mk XII	50
Vickers-Maxim	Mk M	Mk XIII	50
Driggs-Seaburry	?	Mk XIV	50

The US Navy used several types of 3-pounder guns from multiple manufacturers and it is difficult to determine from references which type a particular ship carried. Hotchkiss 3-pounder 5-barrel revolving cannons were used, along with single-barrel quick-firing single-shot Hotchkiss 3-pounders. Both are called rapid-firing (RF) in references. Ships on both sides in the Spanish–American War were armed with Hotchkiss 3-pounders. Although removed from first-line warships by World War I, some 3-pounders were fitted on patrol vessels, with a few weapons serving on those ships through World War II.

- Amphitrite-class monitors
- Asheville-class gunboats
- Chester-class cruisers
- Columbia-class cruisers
- Connecticut-class battleships
- Delaware-class battleships
- Maine-class battleships
- Mississippi-class battleships
- New Orleans-class cruisers
- New York-class battleships
- Northampton-class cruisers
- Pennsylvania-class cruisers
- Pensacola-class cruisers
- Portland-class cruisers
- South Carolina-class battleships
- St. Louis-class cruisers
- Tennessee-class cruisers
- Virginia-class battleships
- Wilmington-class gunboats
- Wyoming-class battleships
- Yorktown-class gunboats
- USS Atlanta (1884)
- USS Baltimore (C-3)
- USS Birmingham (CL-2)
- USS Boston (1884)
- USS Charleston (C-2)
- USS Chester (CL-1)
- USS New York (ACR-2)
- USS Newark (C-1)
- USS Philadelphia (C-4)
- USS Salem (CL-3)
- USS San Francisco (C-5)

== Ammunition ==
The most common types of ammunition available for 3-pounder guns were low yield Steel shells and common lyddite shells. In World War II higher yield high explosive rounds were produced.

A steel shell round circa. 1898	Mk IV base percussion fuze	Mk V N.T. projectile, 1914	Mk II common shell

== Photo gallery ==
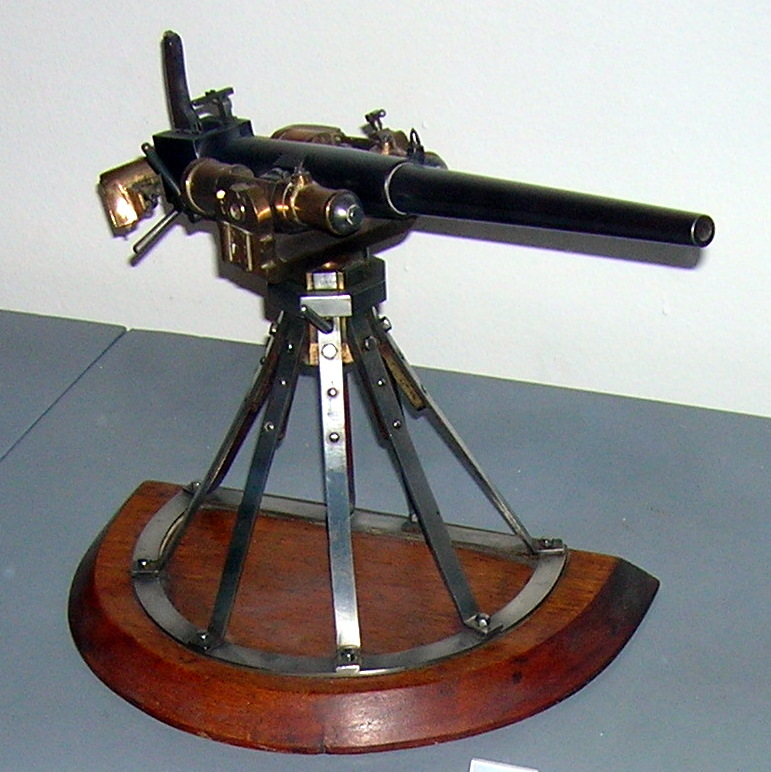
Model of gun in French service on "elastic frame" mounting (affût-crinoline), at the Musée national de la Marine Paris.

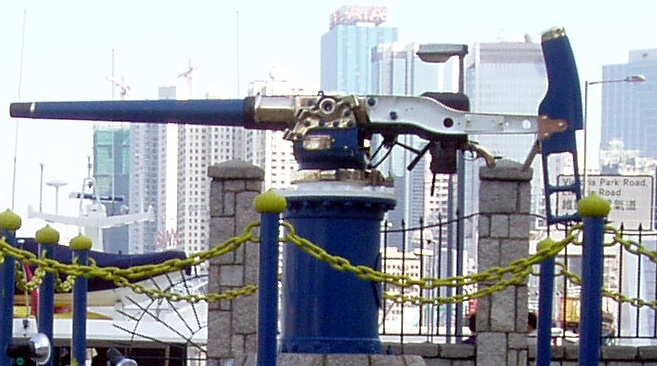
The Noonday gun at Causeway Bay, Hong Kong

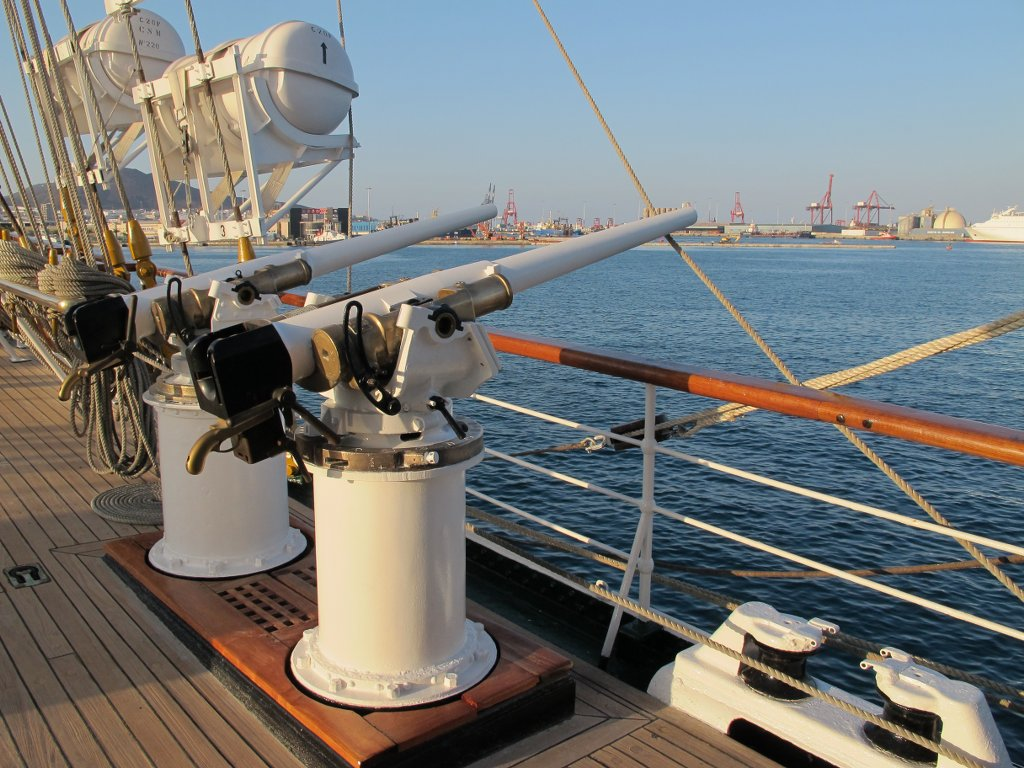
Two of the four operational QF 3 pounder Hotchkiss cannons aboard ARA Libertad

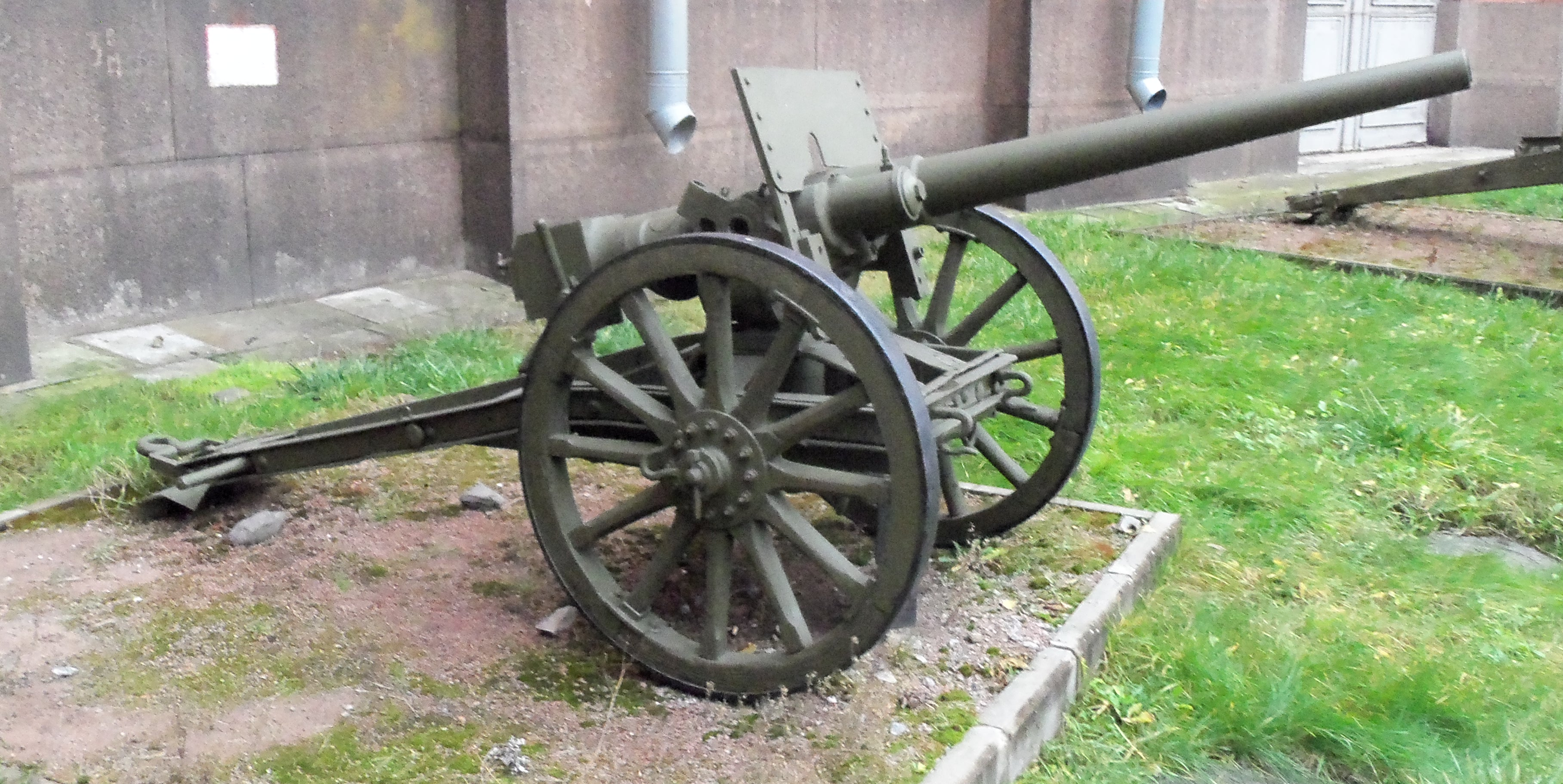
Russian Hotchkiss gun on a field carriage. Military-historical Museum of Artillery, Engineer and Signal Corps. St. Petersburg Russia.

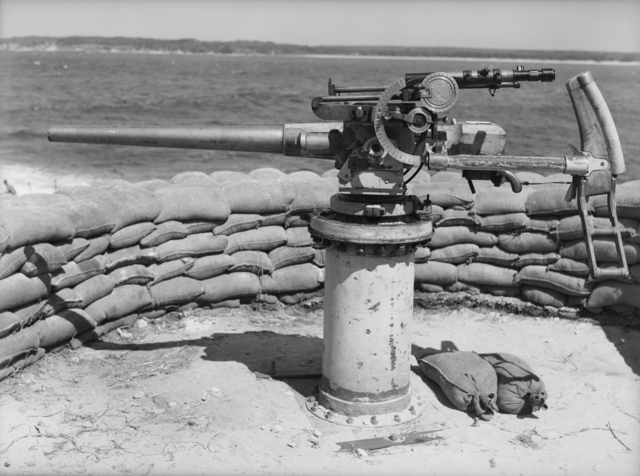
A 3-pounder coastal-defense gun at Port Jackson 1942.

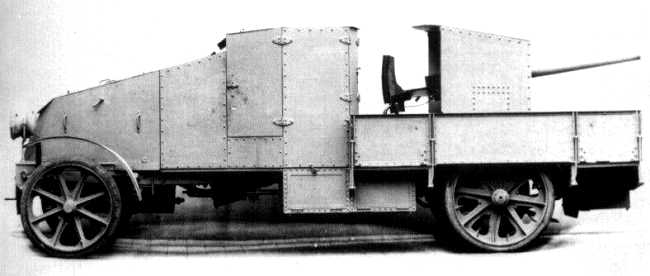
A Russian 3-pounder on a Renault armored car 1917.

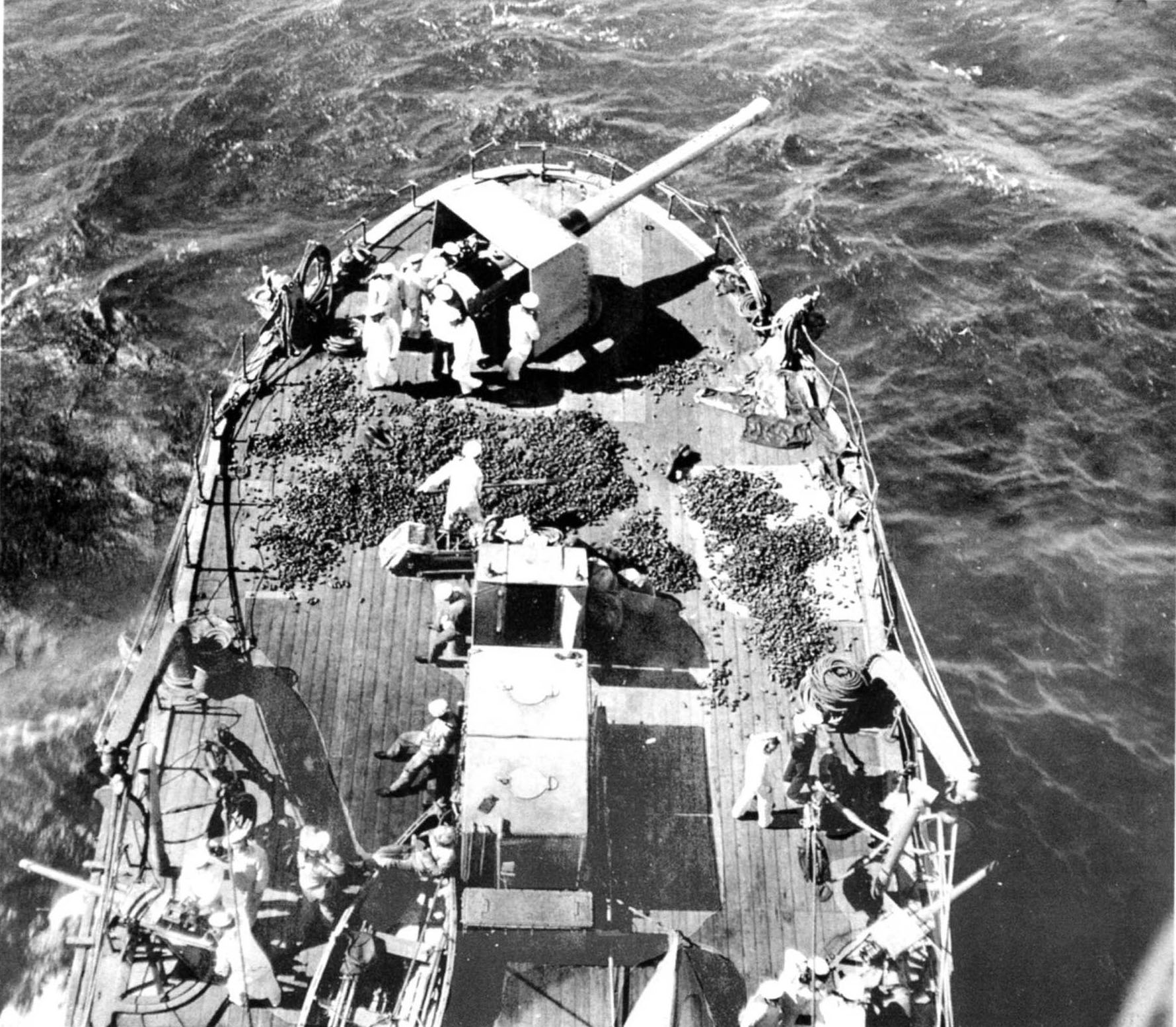
The Imperial Russian cruiser Rossia. 3-pounders at the bottom left/right.

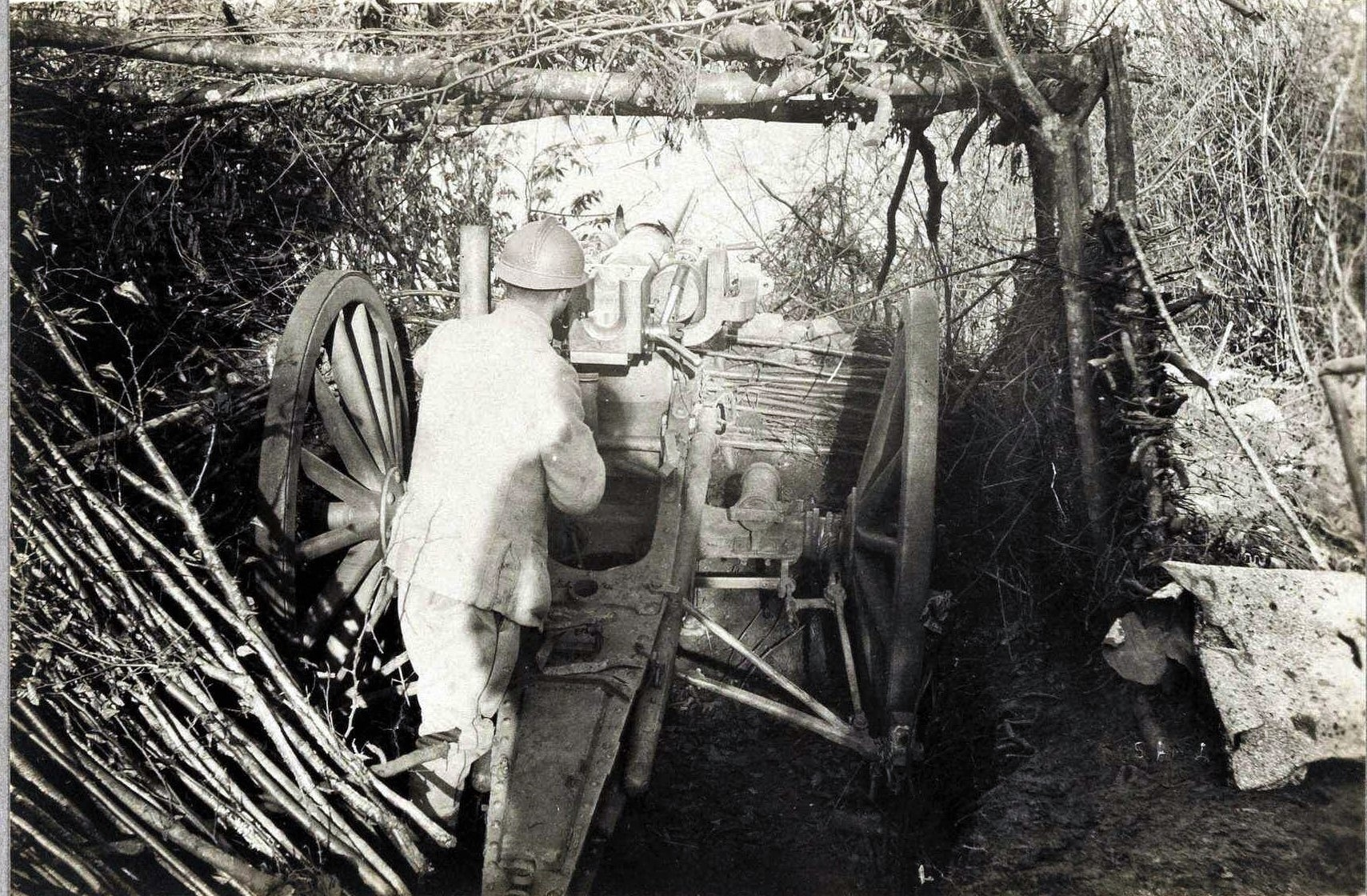
A French 3-pounder on a 90 mm gun carriage.

== Surviving examples ==
- The Jardines Noonday gun at Causeway Bay, Hong Kong.
- A gun at the 1881 Heritage in Tsim Sha Tsui, Hong Kong
- A gun at the Royal Queensland Yacht Squadron, Manly, Queensland, Australia.
- Two guns on "elastic frame" mounting in the Casemate de l'Aschenbach, Uffheim, Haut-Rhin, France.
- A saluting battery of multiple guns at Fort Queenscliff, Victoria, Australia.
- Four guns on the tall ship Libertad, which serves as a school ship in the Argentine Navy; all fully operational as saluting battery or multipurpose defense.
- 3 guns used for ceremonial purposes at HMS Drake.
- 4 guns used for ceremonial purposes at Fort Blockhouse.
- National Museum of the United States Navy has one on display with 1910 brass gun sight and slide manufactured at the Naval Gun Factory.

== Weapons of comparable role, performance and era ==
- QF 3 pounder Nordenfelt : Nordenfelt equivalent
- QF 3 pounder Vickers : Vickers equivalent
- 5 cm SK L/40 gun : German equivalent

== Licensed production ==
- Elswick Ordnance Company
- Obukhov State Plant
- Skoda Works
- William Cramp & Sons

== Wars ==
- First Sino-Japanese War
- Spanish–American War
- Russo-Japanese War
- Italo-Turkish War
- First Balkan War
- Second Balkan War
- World War I
- Winter War
- World War II

== Users ==
- Argentina
- Austria-Hungary
- Brazil
- Bulgaria
- Chile
- Cuba
- Denmark
- Ecuador
- Finland
- France
- Greece
- Italy
- Empire of Japan
- Latvia
- Norway
- Ottoman Empire
- Peru
- Poland
- Portugal
- Qing Dynasty
- Republic of China
- Romania
- Russian Empire
- Spain
- United Kingdom
- Uruguay
- United States
- Venezuela
