= Edgar Quinet-class cruiser =

French armoured cruiser class

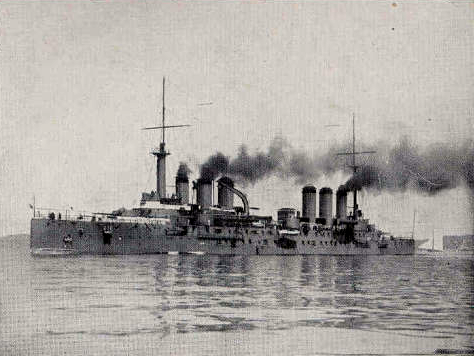
- Edgar Quinet in 1913

Class overview
- Name: Edgar Quinet class
- Builders: Arsenal de Brest; Arsenal de Lorient
- Operators: French Navy
- Preceded by: Ernest Renan
- Succeeded by: None
- Built: 1905–1911
- In service: 1911–1932
- Completed: 2
- Lost: 1
- Retired: 1

General characteristics
- Class & type: Armored cruiser
- Displacement: 13,847 to 13,995 long tons (14,069 to 14,220 t)
- Length: 158.9 m (521 ft)
- Beam: 21.51 m (70 ft 7 in)
- Draft: 8.41 m (27 ft 7 in)
- Installed power: 40 × Belleville boilers; 36,000 ihp (26,845 kW)
- Propulsion: 3 × triple-expansion engines; 3 × shafts
- Speed: 23 knots (43 km/h; 26 mph)
- Range: 10,000 nmi (19,000 km; 12,000 mi) at 10 knots (19 km/h; 12 mph)
- Crew: 859–892
- Armament: 14 × 194 mm (7.6 in) guns; 20 × 65 mm (2.6 in) guns; 2 × 450 mm (18 in) torpedo tubes
- Armor: Belt: 150 mm (5.9 in); Gun turrets: 200 mm (7.9 in); Casemates: 194 mm (7.6 in); Conning tower: 200 mm

The Edgar Quinet class was the last type of armored cruiser built for the French Navy. The two ships of this class—Edgar Quinet and Waldeck-Rousseau—were built between 1905 and 1911. They were based on the previous cruiser, Ernest Renan, the primary improvement being a more powerful uniform main battery of 194 mm (7.6 in) guns. The Edgar Quinet class was the most powerful type of armored cruiser built in France, but they entered service more than two years after the British battlecruiser HMS Invincible, which, with its all-big-gun armament, had rendered armored cruisers obsolescent.

Both ships operated together in the Mediterranean Fleet after entering service, and they remained in the fleet throughout World War I. They participated in the blockade of the Adriatic to keep the Austro-Hungarian Navy contained early in the war. During this period, Edgar Quinet took part in the Battle of Antivari in August 1914, and Waldeck-Rousseau was unsuccessfully attacked twice by Austro-Hungarian U-boats. Waldeck-Rousseau participated in the Allied intervention in the Russian Civil War in the Black Sea in 1919–22, while Edgar Quinet remained in the Mediterranean during the contemporaneous Greco-Turkish War.

Edgar Quinet was converted into a training ship in the mid-1920s before running aground off the Algerian coast in January 1930. She could not be pulled free and sank five days later. Waldeck-Rousseau served as the flagship of the Far East fleet from 1929 to 1932 and was decommissioned after returning to France. She was hulked in 1936 and scrapped in 1941–44.

== Development ==
Plan and profile drawing of the Edgar Quinet class

In the 1890s, naval theorists of the Jeune École (Young School) in France, particularly Admiral Ernest François Fournier, advocated building a fleet of armored cruisers based on the first French ship of that type, Dupuy de Lôme. The ships were to be capable of long-range commerce raiding, action in the line of battle against older battleships, and reconnaissance for the main fleet. The French Navy subsequently built a series of twenty-four armored cruisers after Dupuy de Lôme, culminating in the two Edgar-Quinet-class ships that were ordered under the 1904 and 1905 construction programs.

The design for these last two ships was based heavily on their predecessor, Ernest Renan, though they incorporated several improvements. The most significant was the adoption of a uniform primary gun battery; Ernest Renan carried a mix of two 194 mm (7.6 in) and twelve 165 mm (6.5 in) guns, but the Edgar Quinet dispensed with the smaller guns in favor of fourteen 194 mm weapons. Their armor layout was also modified and the adopted the same vertical stem that characterized the latest French pre-dreadnought battleships.

Like Ernest Renan, the design for the Edgar Quinet class was repeatedly reworked during construction, which produced very lengthy construction times. The Edgar Quinets were the most powerful armored cruisers built by France, but they entered service two years after the British Invincible-class battlecruisers, and the British ships' all-big-gun armament and steam turbine propulsion rendered all armored cruisers obsolescent. Compared to the British vessels, the Edgar Quinets retained less effective triple-expansion steam engines, though they were the last major warship to use them.

== Description ==
=== General characteristics and machinery ===
The ships of the Edgar Quinet class were 157 m (515 ft 1 in) long at the waterline and 158.9 m (521 ft 4 in) long overall. They had a beam of 21.51 m (70 ft 7 in) and a draft of 8.41 m (27 ft 7 in). Edgar Quinet displaced 13,847 long tons (14,069 t), while Waldeck-Rousseau was slightly heavier, at 13,995 long tons (14,220 t). The hulls were constructed with mild steel and were fitted with bilge keels to improve stability. The ships had a military foremast with a fighting top and a pole mainmast. The forecastle deck extended for most of the ship, as far as the main mast. They had a crew of 23 officers and 818 enlisted men, and while serving as a divisional flagship, the ships' crew increased by 9 officers and 72 enlisted men of the admiral's staff.

Their power plant consisted of three 4-cylinder triple-expansion steam engines that each drove a screw propeller. Steam was provided by forty coal-fired Belleville type water-tube boilers in Edgar Quinet and forty-two Niclausse boilers in Waldeck-Rousseau. The boilers were trunked into six funnels in two groups of three. The engines were rated at 36,000 indicated horsepower (27,000 kW) and produced a top speed of 23 knots (43 km/h; 26 mph). The engines were divided into individual watertight compartments, while the boilers were grouped in pairs in watertight compartments. Maximum coal capacity amounted to 2,300 long tons (2,300 t), which permitted a cruising range of 10,000 nautical miles (19,000 km; 12,000 mi) at a speed of 10 knots (19 km/h; 12 mph). Electrical power was supplied by six electric generators.

=== Armament and armor ===
Illustration of Edgar Quinet

The Edgar Quinet-class ships were armed with a main battery of fourteen 194 mm (7.6 in) 50-caliber M1902 guns; four were in twin gun turrets forward and aft, with three single gun turrets on either broadside. The turret mountings allowed for loading at any angle of elevation, and were electrically operated. The forward turrets had a range of train of about 280 degrees. The last four guns were mounted in casemates abreast the main and aft conning towers, on the upper and main decks, respectively. The 194 mm gun had a rate of fire of up to four rounds per minute. The ships' ammunition magazines were equipped with refrigeration, which was standardized in French warships following the accidental destruction of the battleship Iéna by an overheated propellant magazine in 1907. Close-range defense against torpedo boats was provided by a battery of twenty 65 mm (2.6 in) 9-pounder guns in casemates in the ship's hull. In 1918, twelve of the ships' 65 mm guns were removed and a pair of 65 mm anti-aircraft guns (AA) and a pair of 75 mm (3 in) AA guns were installed. Edgar Quinet and Waldeck-Rousseau were also equipped with two 450 mm (17.7 in) torpedo tubes submerged in the hull.

The ships were protected with an armored belt that was 150 mm (5.9 in) thick amidships and reduced to 70 mm (2.8 in) forward and 40 mm (1.6 in) aft. They had two armored decks; the lower, main deck was 65 mm thick and the upper deck was 30 mm (1.2 in). The gun turrets had 200 mm (7.9 in) thick plating, with 200 mm thick barbettes, while the casemates had marginally thinner protection, at 194 mm. The two pairs of casemates were linked by transverse armored bulkheads; the outer bulkhead was 194 mm thick while the inner bulkhead was 120 mm (4.7 in) thick. The main conning tower had 200 mm thick sides. (Note: The armor layout is somewhat unclear; in Directory of the World's Capital Ships, Silverstone provides different figures, including a thicker, 170 mm (6.7 in) armored belt and thinner protection for the gun turrets and casemates, at 150 mm (5.9 in) and 120 mm (4.7 in), respectively. Additionally, Peltier's contemporary (1908) description offers a third set of figures.) Underwater protection consisted of a cofferdam built into the lower hull with a longitudinal watertight bulkhead behind it.

== Ships ==
Construction data
Name	Builder	Laid down	Launched	Commissioned	Fate
Edgar Quinet	Arsenal de Brest, Brest	November 1905	21 September 1907	January 1911	Wrecked, 4 January 1930
Waldeck-Rousseau	Arsenal de Lorient	16 June 1906	4 March 1908	August 1911	Scrapped, 1941–1943

== Service history ==
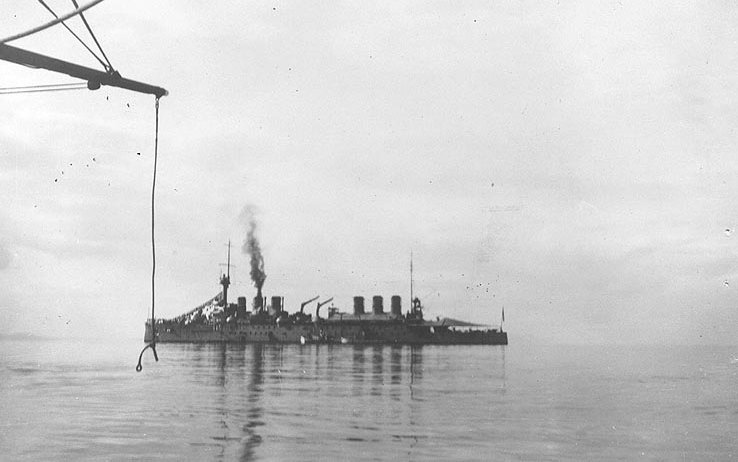
Waldeck-Rousseau off Constantinople in 1922

After entering service in early and mid-1911, respectively, Edgar Quinet and Waldeck-Rousseau were assigned to the Mediterranean Fleet. In 1913, Edgar Quinet participated in an international naval demonstration that also included British, German, and Austro-Hungarian vessels off Albania. The demonstration was a protest of the siege of Scutari during the First Balkan War; it succeeded in forcing the Serbian army to withdraw and allowing an international force to occupy the city.

Both Edgar Quinet and Waldeck-Rousseau saw service in the Mediterranean during World War I. Edgar Quinet joined the hunt for the German battlecruiser SMS Goeben in August 1914, and both ships participated in the blockade of the Austro-Hungarian Navy in the Adriatic. Later in August, Edgar Quinet was present at the Battle of Antivari, which saw the sinking of the Austro-Hungarian cruiser SMS Zenta. While on patrol at the mouth of the Adriatic, Waldeck-Rousseau was attacked twice by Austro-Hungarian U-boats, though neither submarine was able to hit the cruiser. During the first action in October, several Austro-Hungarian destroyers briefly skirmished with Waldeck-Rousseau after the U-boat attacked her. Both cruisers were involved in the seizure of Corfu in January 1916.

After the end of the war, both ships continued service in the eastern Mediterranean and Black Seas. Waldeck-Rousseau joined the Allied intervention in the Russian Civil War and operated in support of the White Russians against the Red Bolsheviks; shortly after arriving, her crew mutinied over poor conditions but quickly resumed their duties. Edgar Quinet meanwhile remained in the Mediterranean during the Greco-Turkish War, and during the Great Fire of Smyrna, at the climax of the conflict, she rescued 1,200 people from the city.

Edgar Quinet was converted into a training ship in the mid-1920s, a role she filled for the remainder of the decade. On 4 January 1930, she ran aground off the Algerian coast and could not be freed. She sank five days later. Waldeck-Rousseau had meanwhile been assigned as the flagship of the Far East fleet in 1929, where she remained until 1932, when she returned to France. She was decommissioned upon arrival, hulked in 1936, and broken up for scrap in 1941–1944.
