= French cruiser Condé =

French Navy's Gloire-class armored cruisers

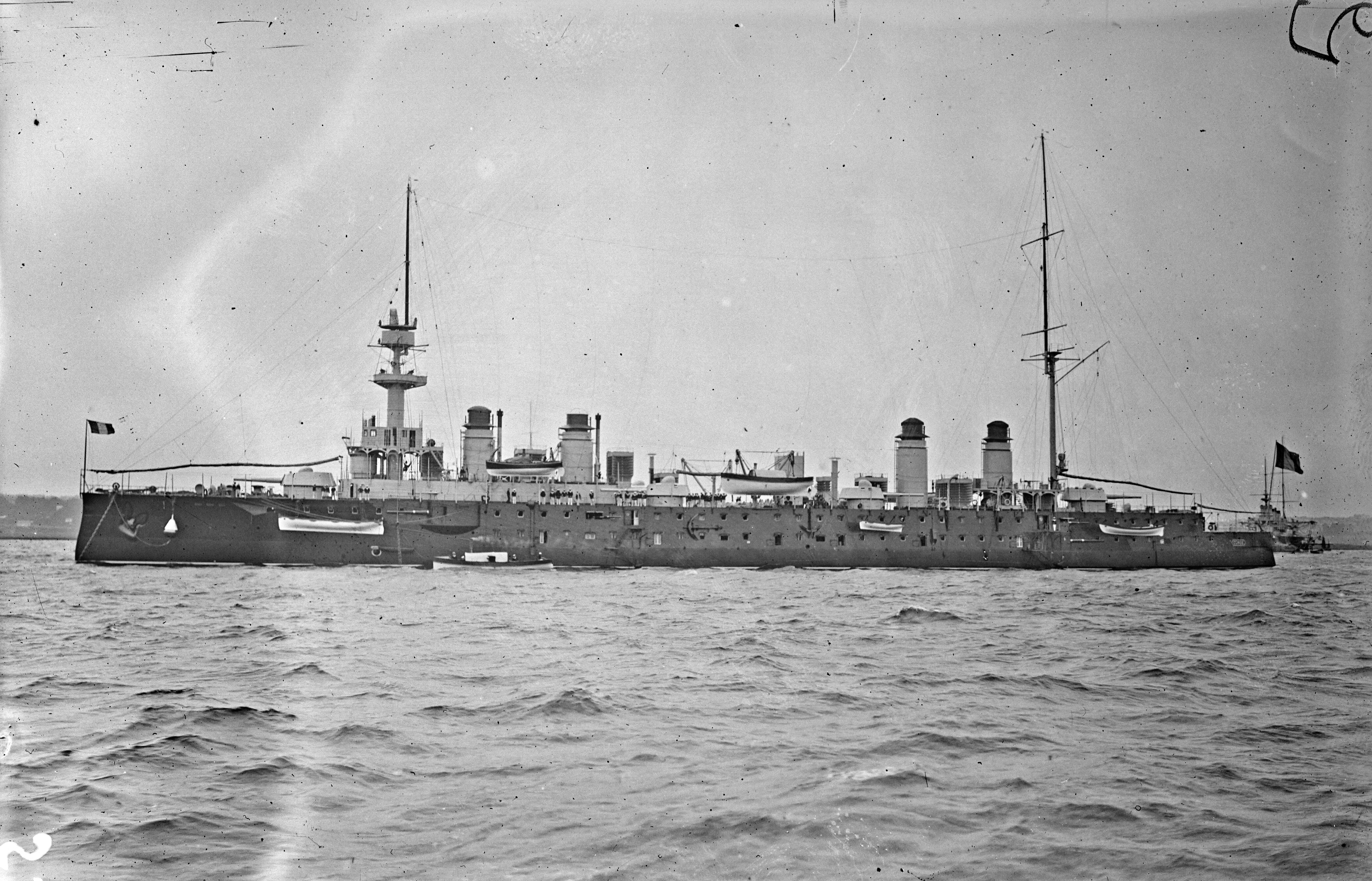
- Condé in the roadstead of Brest on 10 July 1905

History

France
- Name: Condé
- Namesake: Louis, Grand Condé
- Builder: Arsenal de Lorient
- Cost: 23,000,000f
- Laid down: 29 January 1901
- Launched: 12 March 1902
- Completed: 12 August 1904
- Decommissioned: 1933
- Fate: Sunk by aircraft, 1944

General characteristics
- Class & type: Gloire-class cruiser
- Displacement: 9,996 t (9,838 long tons)
- Length: 139.78 m (458 ft 7 in) (o/a)
- Beam: 20.2 m (66 ft 3 in)
- Draft: 7.55 m (24.8 ft)
- Installed power: 28 Niclausse boilers; 20,500 PS (15,100 kW)
- Propulsion: 3 shafts, 3 triple-expansion steam engines
- Speed: 21 knots (39 km/h; 24 mph)
- Range: 6,500 nautical miles (12,000 km; 7,500 mi) at 10 knots (19 km/h; 12 mph)
- Complement: 615
- Armament: 2 × single 194 mm (7.6 in) guns; 8 × single 164.7 mm (6.5 in) guns; 6 × single 100 mm (3.9 in) guns; 18 × single 47 mm (1.9 in) guns; 4 × single 37 mm (1.5 in) guns; 5 × 450 mm (17.7 in) torpedo tubes
- Armor: Belt: 70–150 mm (2.8–5.9 in); Main-gun turrets: 161 mm (6.3 in); Barbettes: 174 mm (6.9 in); Deck: 34–45 mm (1.3–1.8 in); Conning tower: 174 mm (6.9 in)

The French cruiser Condé was one of five Gloire-class armored cruisers built for the French Navy (Marine Nationale) in the early 1900s. Fitted with a mixed armament of 194-millimeter (7.6 in) and 164.7-millimeter (6.5 in) guns, the ships were designed for service with the fleet. Completed in 1904, Condé joined her sister ships in the Northern Squadron (Escadre du Nord). She was transferred to the Mediterranean Squadron (Escadre de la Méditerranée) two years later, but rejoined the 2nd Light Squadron (2^{e} Escadre légère), as the units based in northwestern France had been renamed, in 1912, together with two of her sisters.

Condé was transferred to the Atlantic Division (Division de l'Atlantique) in early 1914 and protected French interests and citizens during the Mexican Revolution. She was still there when World War I began in August and spent most of the war unsuccessfully hunting for German commerce raiders. The cruiser was sent to North Russia in mid-1919 as part of the Allied intervention in the Russian Civil War and covered the evacuation of Allied troops later that year. The ship was placed in reserve the following year and became a barracks ship two years later. In 1928 Condé became a training ship until she was hulked in 1933, although she continued to be used. The cruiser was captured during the German invasion of France in 1940 and was used as a depot ship until she was sunk in 1944. Her wreck was scrapped ten years later.

== Design and description ==
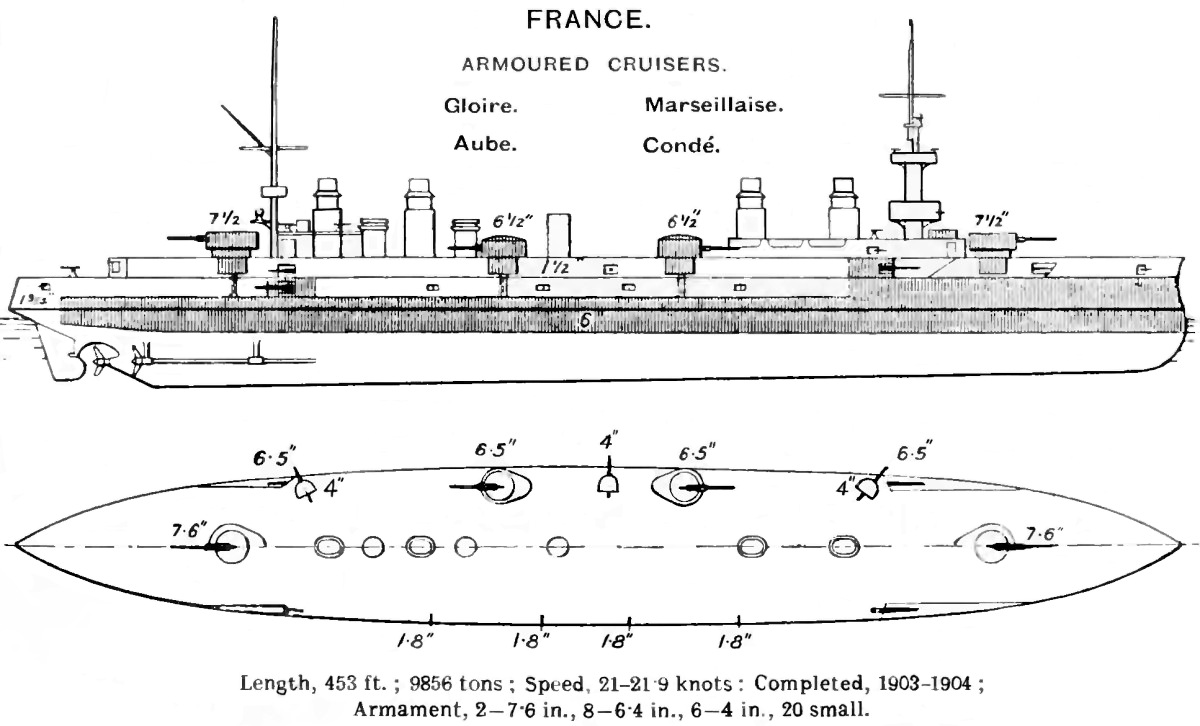
Right elevation and plan of the Gloire-class armored cruisers

The Gloire-class ships were designed by the naval architect Emile Bertin as enlarged and improved versions of the preceding Gueydon class. The ships measured 139.78 meters (458 ft 7 in) overall, with a beam of 20.2 meters (66 ft 3 in) and a draft of 7.55 meters (24 ft 9 in). They displaced 9,996 metric tons (9,838 long tons). Their crew numbered 25 officers and 590 enlisted men.

The sisters' propulsion machinery consisted of three vertical triple-expansion steam engines, each driving a single propeller shaft, using steam provided by water-tube boilers, but the types of machinery differed between them. Condé had three-cylinder engines fed by 28 Niclausse boilers that were designed to produce a total of 20,500 metric horsepower (15,100 kW) intended to give her a maximum speed of 21 knots (39 km/h; 24 mph). During her sea trials on 11 May 1904, the ship reached 21.31 knots (39.47 km/h; 24.52 mph) from 22,331 metric horsepower (16,424 kW). The cruisers carried enough coal to give them a range of 6,500 nautical miles (12,000 km; 7,500 mi) at a speed of 10 knots (19 km/h; 12 mph).

=== Armament and armor ===
The main battery of the Gloire class consisted of two quick-firing (QF) 194 mm Modèle 1893–1896 guns mounted in single-gun turrets fore and aft of the superstructure. Their secondary armament comprised eight QF 164.7 mm Modèle 1893–1896 guns and six QF Canon de 100 mm (3.9 in) Modèle de 1893 guns. Half of the 164.7 mm guns were in two singe-gun wing turrets on each broadside and all of the remaining guns were on single mounts in casemates in the hull. For defense against torpedo boats, they carried eighteen 47-millimeter (1.9 in) and four 37-millimeter (1.5 in) Hotchkiss guns, all of which were in single mounts. The sisters were also armed with five 450-millimeter (17.7 in) torpedo tubes, of which two were submerged and three above water. Two of these were on each broadside and the fifth tube was in the stern. All of the above-water tubes were on pivot mounts. The ships varied in the number of naval mines that they could carry and Condé was fitted with storage for 12.

The Gloire class were the first French armored cruisers to have their waterline armored belt made from Harvey face-hardened armor plates. The belt ranged in thickness from 70 to 150 millimeters (2.8 to 5.9 in). Because of manufacturing limitations, the thinner end plates were nickel steel. Behind the belt was a cofferdam, backed by a longitudinal watertight bulkhead. The upper armored deck met the top of the belt and had a total thickness of 34 millimeters (1.3 in) while the lower armored deck curved down to meet the bottom of the belt and had a uniform thickness of 45 millimeters (1.8 in).

The main-gun turrets were protected by 161 millimeters (6.3 in) of Harvey armor, but their barbettes used 174-millimeter (6.9 in) plates of ordinary steel. The face and sides of the secondary turrets were 92 millimeters (3.6 in) thick and the plates protecting their barbettes were 102 millimeters (4 in) thick. The casemates protecting the 100-millimeter guns also had a thickness of 102 millimeters. The face and sides of the conning tower were 174 millimeters thick.

== Construction and career ==
Condé, named after Louis, Grand Condé, was authorized in the 1896 Naval Program and was ordered from the Arsenal de Cherbourg on 17 September 1898. The order for the ship was transferred to the Arsenal de Lorient on 8 April 1898 where she was laid down on 29 January 1901, after her sister Gloire vacated the slipway. Condé was launched on 12 March 1902, and completed on 12 August 1904. The cost of her construction was 21,594,975 francs. The ship was initially assigned to the 1st Cruiser Division (1^{re} Division de croiseurs) of the Northern Squadron; together with her sisters Gloire and Amiral Aube, Condé escorted the remains of John Paul Jones from France to Annapolis, Maryland, and then went on to visit New York City. The ship was transferred to the Mediterranean Squadron's Light Squadron in 1906. By June 1910, after a reorganization that saw the Mediterranean Squadron redesignated as the 1st Squadron (1^{re} Escadre) and the Light Squadron split in half, Condé and her sisters Gloire and Amiral Aube were assigned to the 2nd Light Division (2^{e} Division légère (DL)).

As more modern armored cruisers entered service, they were concentrated in the Mediterranean and Condé and Gloire joined their sister by January 1911 in the Cruiser Division of the 2nd Squadron, as the Northern Squadron had been redesignated. In March the sisters visited New York City. When the Danton-class battleships began entering service in August, the French Navy reorganized yet again with the 2nd Squadron renumbered as the 3rd and the Cruiser Division was renamed as the 3rd DL. After the Agadir Crisis of 1911, the French and British governments agreed in 1912 that the Royal Navy would defend the northern French coast and the French would concentrate their fleet in the Mediterranean and defend British interests there. The French forces left in the north were consolidated into the 2nd Light Squadron with the 3rd DL redesignated as the 1st Cruiser Squadron. Condé was transferred to the Atlantic Division, based in the French West Indies, in early 1914. During the United States occupation of Veracruz beginning in April 1914, the cruiser was frequently off the coast of Mexico to protect French citizens and interests during the Mexican Revolution.

=== World War I ===
As tensions rose during the July Crisis, Condé and the protected cruiser Descartes were at Veracruz, Mexico, on 30 July when they were recalled home. The declaration of war between France and Germany on 4 August interrupted these plans, and the next day, the French ships were assigned to the British 4th Cruiser Squadron to join the unsuccessful hunt for the German light cruiser SMS Karlsruhe, which was known to be in the area. On 16 October, Condé joined with the British armored cruiser HMS Berwick to search for the German ship off the coast of Brazil. Concerned that the German East Asia Squadron might try and pass through the newly opened Panama Canal, the British Admiralty concentrated all its available cruisers in the West Indies on 8 November until the German ships were spotted off the coast of Chile five days later. Unbeknownst to the Allies, Karlsruhe had been destroyed by an internal explosion on 8 November, but Condé and Descartes remained in the West Indies until August 1915. On 14 February Condé relieved the light cruiser HMAS Sydney watching the interned German merchant ships in San Juan, Puerto Rico.

By January 1916 Condé had been joined by Marseillaise in the West Indies and they were joined by their other two sisters in May when yet another reorganization recreated the 3rd DL which was tasked to search for German commerce raiders. Condé returned to France for a refit at the Forges et Chantiers de la Gironde shipyard in Bordeaux in July. With the reduced threat from commerce raiders in 1917, the numbers of armored cruisers were reduced and the Atlantic and Antilles Division (Division de l'Atlantique et des Antilles) was organized to control them. Condé joined the unit in late 1917 and the division was tasked with escorting convoys bound for Europe from Saint Thomas, U.S. Virgin Islands, beginning on 15 February 1918. The cruiser, however, departed the West Indies on 1 March. During her absence the division had been renamed the Atlantic Division when she rejoined the unit as a replacement for the torpedoed armored cruiser Dupetit-Thouars in August.

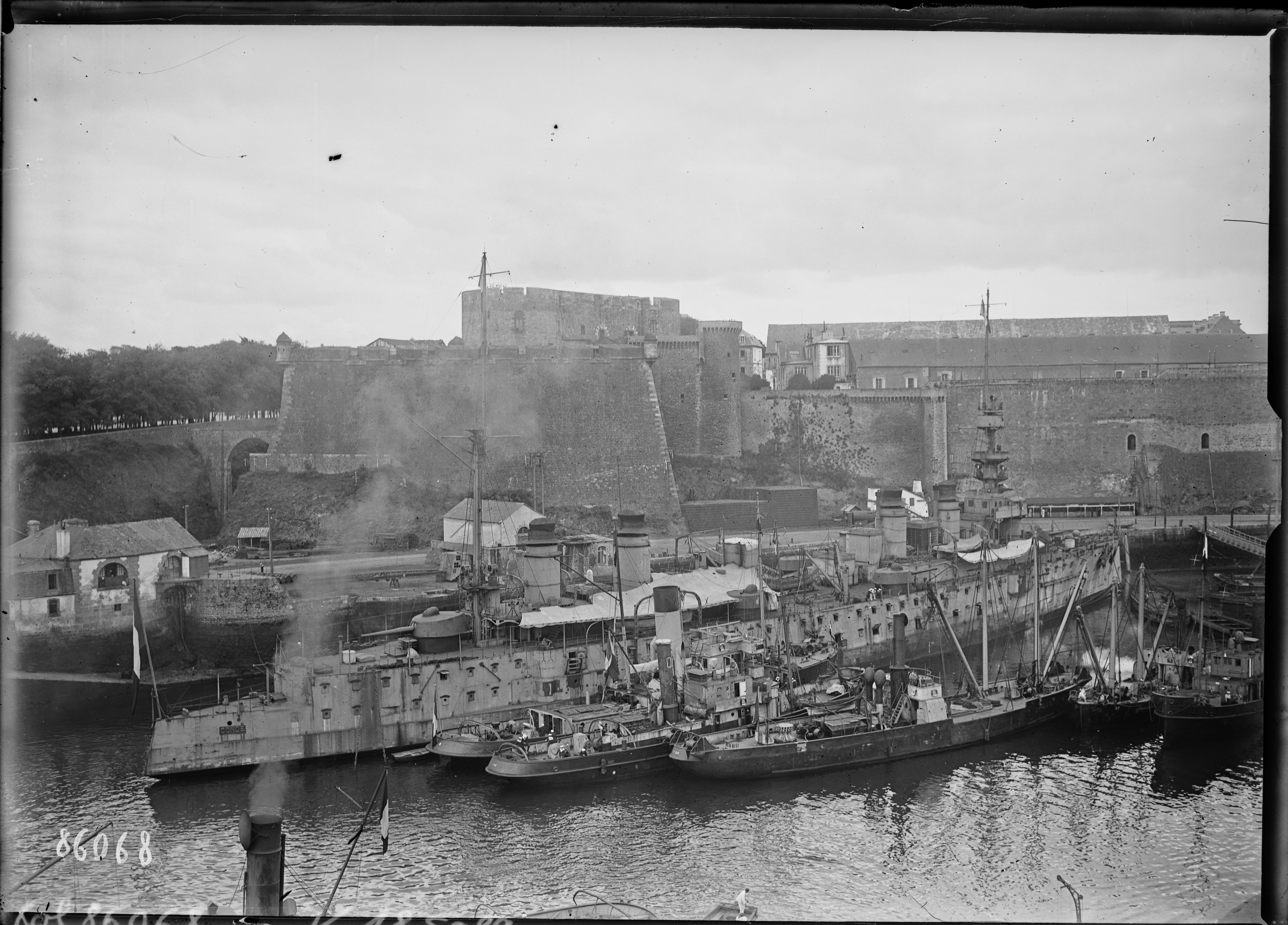
Condé in Brest Arsenal, 1923

Condé was still assigned to the division when the war ended on 11 November, but she had returned to France by 28 May 1919 when the ship transported 176 mutineers from French colonial infantry units from Brest to Casablanca, French Morocco. Condé relieved the armored cruiser Gueydon in the Arctic on 25 June and covered the withdrawal of French troops from Arkhangelsk and the subsequent evacuation of Murmansk by Allied forces on 12 October. The ship was reduced to special reserve on 15 March 1920 at Brest and became a barracks ship for the naval infantry (Fusiliers Marins) two years later at Lorient. In 1928, Condé hosted the Naval Infantry School (École des fusiliers); she was stricken from the naval register on 15 February 1933 and converted into a hulk. She was captured by the Germans in June 1940 who used her as a submarine depot ship. She was sunk by Allied aircraft in 1944 and her wreck was salvaged in 1954 and broken up for scrap.
