= French cruiser Gloire (1900) =

French Navy's Gloire-class armored cruiser

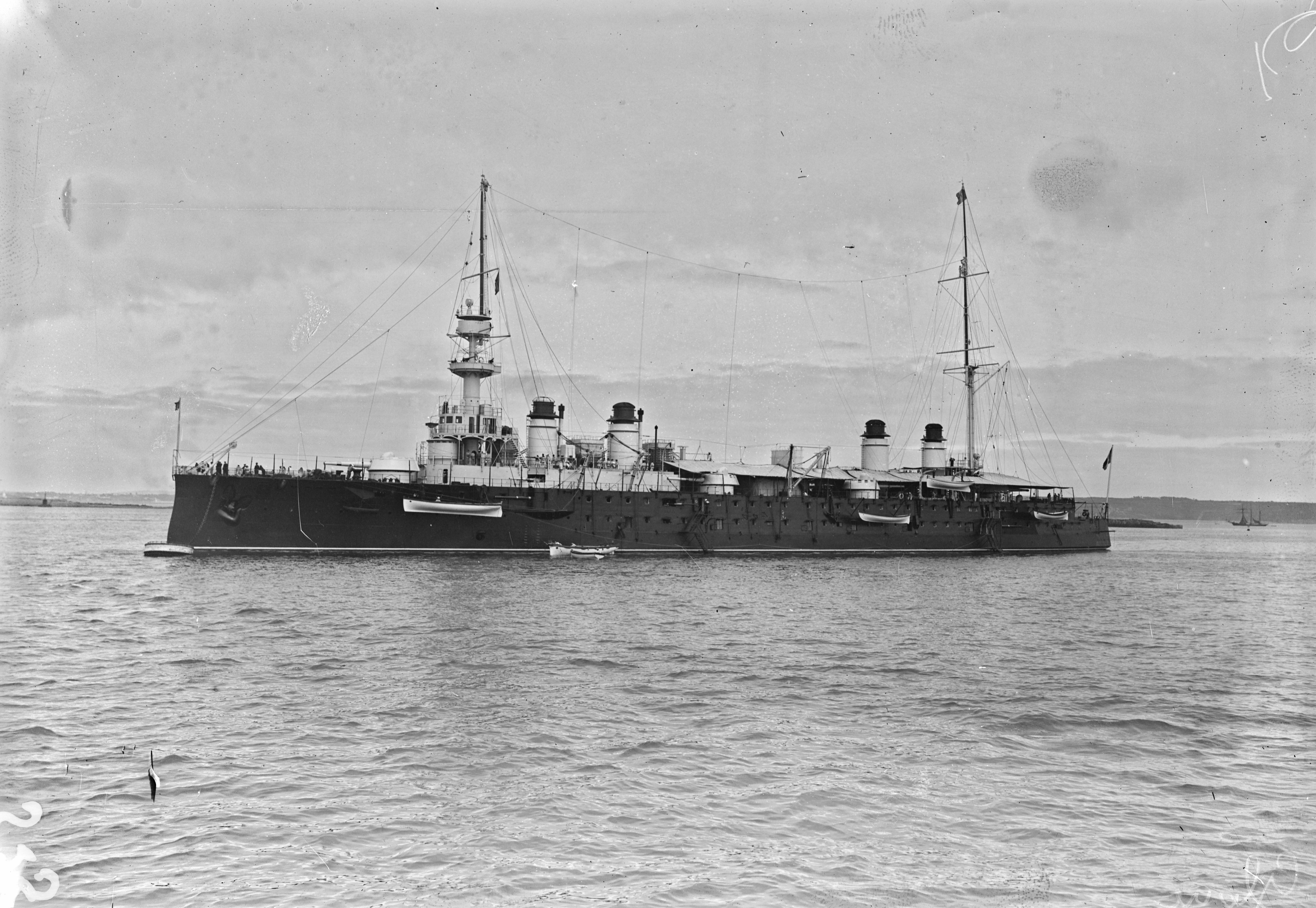
- Gloire in the roadstead of Brest in 1905

History

France
- Name: Gloire
- Namesake: Glory
- Builder: Arsenal de Lorient
- Laid down: 5 September 1899
- Launched: 27 June 1900
- Commissioned: 28 April 1904
- Stricken: 7 July 1922
- Fate: Sold for scrap, 1923

General characteristics
- Class & type: Gloire-class cruiser
- Displacement: 9,996 t (9,838 long tons)
- Length: 139.78 m (458 ft 7 in) (o/a)
- Beam: 20.2 m (66 ft 3 in)
- Draft: 7.55 m (24 ft 9 in)
- Installed power: 28 Niclausse boilers; 20,500 PS (15,100 kW)
- Propulsion: 3 shafts, 3 triple-expansion steam engines
- Speed: 21 knots (39 km/h; 24 mph)
- Range: 6,500 nautical miles (12,000 km; 7,500 mi) at 10 knots (19 km/h; 12 mph)
- Complement: 615
- Armament: 2 × single 194 mm (7.6 in) guns; 8 × single 164.7 mm (6.5 in) guns; 6 × single 100 mm (3.9 in) guns; 18 × single 47 mm (1.9 in) guns; 4 × single 37 mm (1.5 in) guns; 5 × 450 mm (17.7 in) torpedo tubes
- Armor: Belt: 70–150 mm (2.8–5.9 in); Main-gun turrets: 161 mm (6.3 in); Barbettes: 174 mm (6.9 in); Deck: 34–45 mm (1.3–1.8 in); Conning tower: 174 mm (6.9 in)

The French cruiser Gloire was one of five Gloire-class cruisers built for the French Navy (Marine Nationale) in the first decade of the 20th century. Fitted with a mixed armament of 194-millimeter (7.6 in) and 164.7-millimeter (6.5 in) guns, the ships were designed for service with the fleet. Completed in 1904, Gloire joined its sister ships in the Northern Squadron (Escadre du Nord), usually serving as a flagship. It participated in the French bombardment of Casablanca, Morocco, in 1907, and was briefly assigned to the Mediterranean Squadron (Escadre de la Méditeranée) in 1910–1911. Gloire became a training ship in late 1913.

When World War I began in August 1914, it was assigned to patrol the English Channel to enforce the blockade of Germany and remained on that duty into 1916. The cruiser was briefly deployed to French West Africa to search for German commerce raiders later that year before it was transferred to the French West Indies for several months. Increased commerce raiding activity in early 1917 prompted a permanent deployment to the West Indies to escort convoys as part of the Atlantic Division (Division de l'Atlantique). Gloire remained there for at least a year after the war ended in November 1918 before it returned home to be placed in reserve. The ship was stricken in 1922 and sold for scrap the following year.

== Design and description ==
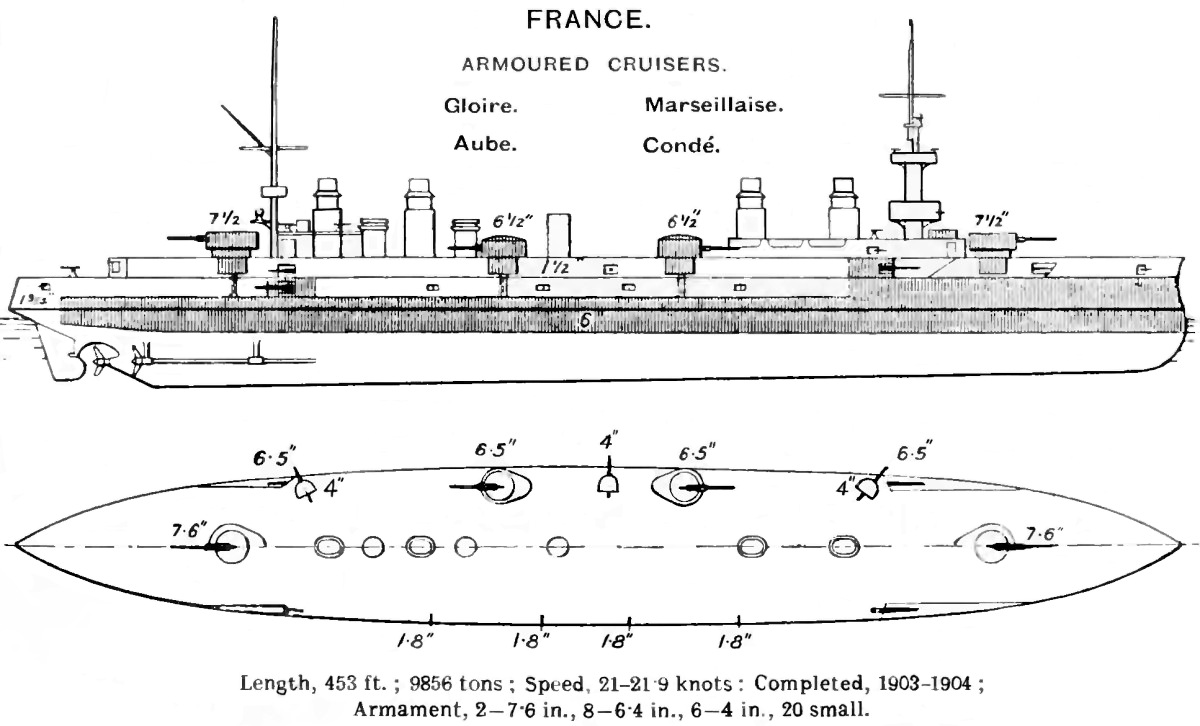
Right elevation and plan of the Gloire-class armored cruisers

The Gloire-class ships were designed by Emile Bertin as enlarged and improved versions of the preceding Gueydon class. The ships measured 139.78 meters (458 ft 7 in) overall, with a beam of 20.2 meters (66 ft 3 in) and a draft of 7.55 meters (24 ft 9 in). They displaced 9,996 metric tons (9,838 long tons). Their crew numbered 25 officers and 590 enlisted men.

The sisters' propulsion machinery consisted of three vertical triple-expansion steam engines, each driving a single propeller shaft, using steam provided by water-tube boilers, but the types of machinery differed between them. Gloire had three-cylinder engines fed by 28 Niclausse boilers that were designed to produce a total of 20,500 metric horsepower (15,100 kW) intended to give it a maximum speed of 21 knots (39 km/h; 24 mph). During its sea trials on 19 January 1904, the ship reached 21.27 knots (39.39 km/h; 24.48 mph) from 21,334 metric horsepower (15,691 kW). The cruisers carried enough coal to give them a range of 6,500 nautical miles (12,000 km; 7,500 mi) at a speed of 10 knots (19 km/h; 12 mph).

=== Armament and armor ===
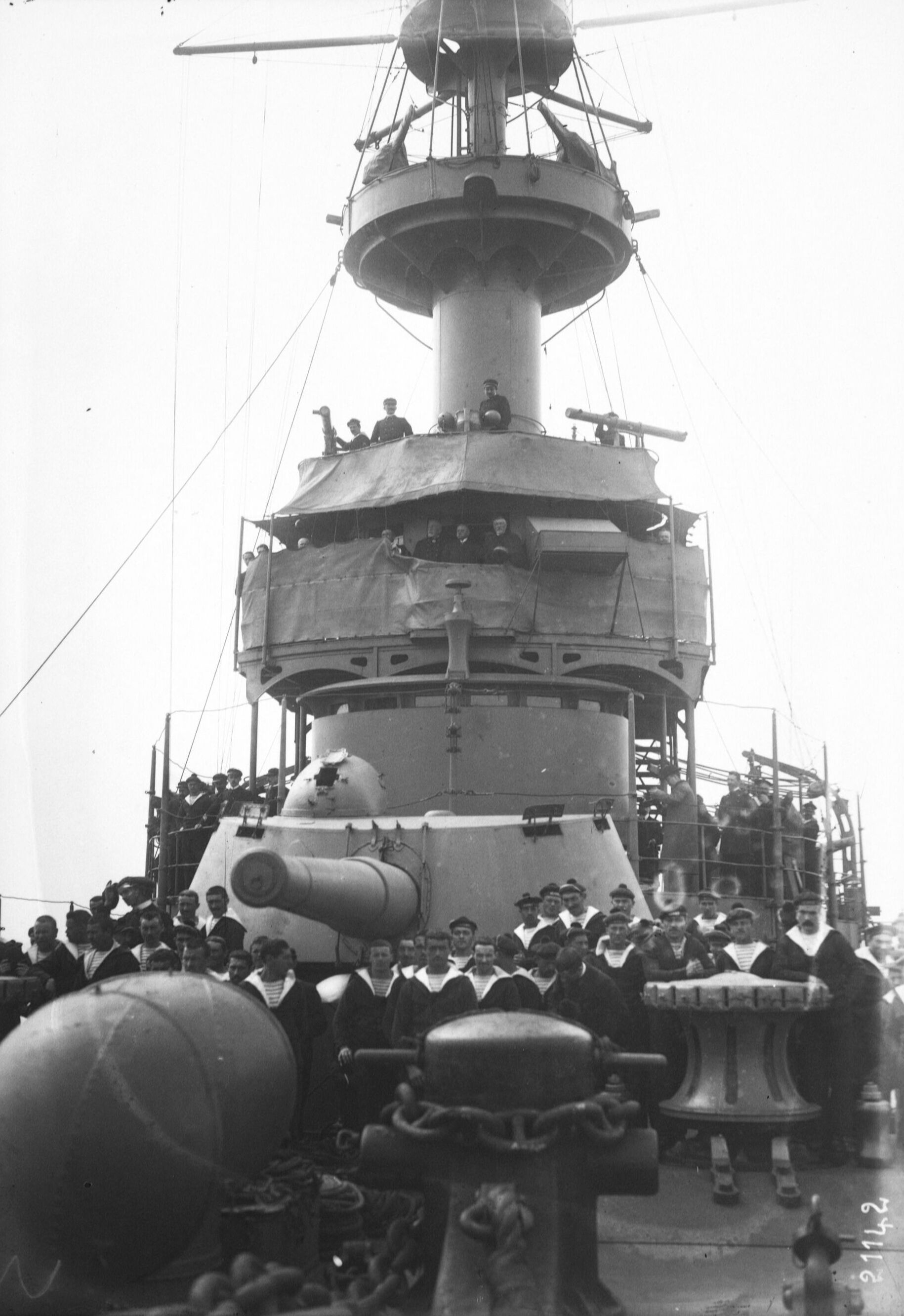
The forward gun turret with the conning tower and bridge behind it

The main battery of the Gloire class consisted of two quick-firing (QF) 194 mm Modèle 1893–1896 guns mounted in single-gun turrets fore and aft of the superstructure. Their secondary armament comprised eight QF 164.7 mm Modèle 1893–1896 guns and six QF Canon de 100 mm (3.9 in) Modèle de 1893 guns. Half of the 164.7 mm guns were in two singe-gun wing turrets on each broadside and all of the remaining guns were on single mounts in casemates in the hull. For defense against torpedo boats, they carried eighteen 47-millimeter (1.9 in) and four 37-millimeter (1.5 in) Hotchkiss guns, all of which were in single mounts. The sisters were also armed with five 450-millimeter (17.7 in) torpedo tubes, of which two were submerged and three above water. Two of these were on each broadside and the fifth tube was in the stern. All of the above-water tubes were on pivot mounts. The ships varied in the number of naval mines that they could carry and Gloire was fitted with storage for 12.

The Gloire class were the first French armored cruisers to have their waterline armored belt made from Harvey face-hardened armor plates. The belt ranged in thickness from 70 to 150 millimeters (2.8 to 5.9 in). Because of manufacturing limitations, the thinner end plates were nickel steel. Behind the belt was a cofferdam, backed by a longitudinal watertight bulkhead. The upper armored deck met the top of the belt and had a total thickness of 34 millimeters (1.3 in) while the lower armored deck curved down to meet the bottom of the belt and had a uniform thickness of 45 millimeters (1.8 in).

The main-gun turrets were protected by 161 millimeters (6.3 in) of Harvey armor, but their barbettes used 174-millimeter (6.9 in) plates of ordinary steel. The face and sides of the secondary turrets were 92 millimeters (3.6 in) thick and the plates protecting their barbettes were 102 millimeters (4 in) thick. The casemates protecting the 100-millimeter guns also had a thickness of 102 millimeters. The face and sides of the conning tower were 174 millimeters thick.

== Construction and career ==
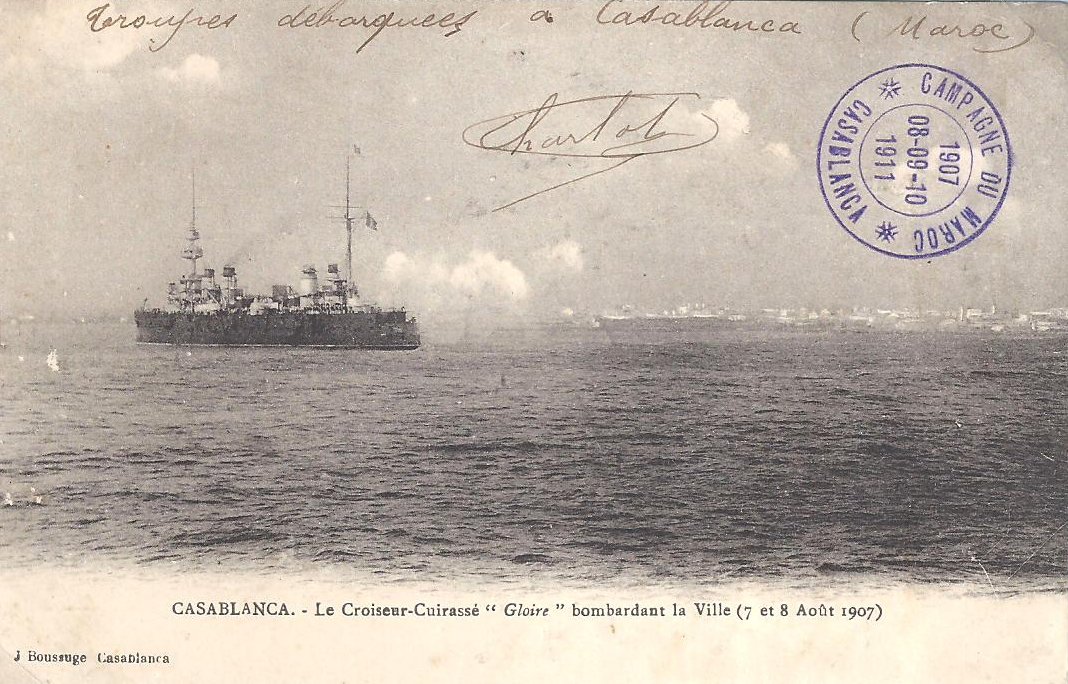
A postcard showing Gloire bombarding Casablanca, Morocco, in 1907

Gloire, named after Glory, was authorized in the 1896 Naval Program and was ordered from the Arsenal de Lorient on 17 September 1898. The ship was laid down on 5 September 1899, launched on 27 June 1900, and completed on 28 April 1904. The cost of its construction was 22,081,725 francs. The ship was assigned as the flagship of Rear Admiral (Contre-amiral) Joseph Bugard, commander of the 1st Cruiser Division (1^{re} Division de croiseurs) of the Northern Squadron. Gloire had been relieved as flagship by 4 August 1905. Together with its sister ships Condé and Amiral Aube, Gloire escorted the remains of John Paul Jones from France to Annapolis, Maryland, in April 1906 and then went on to visit New York City. The 2nd Cruiser Division had been formed by January 1907 and Gloire was the division's flagship. On 7–8 August the ship participated in the bombardment of Casablanca, the first step in the French conquest of Morocco. By October 1907 it was the flagship of Rear Admiral Joseph-Alphonse Philibert.

After a reorganization that saw the Mediterranean Squadron redesignated as the 1st Squadron (1^{re} Escadre), Gloire and its sisters Condé and Marseillaise were assigned to the 2nd Light Division (2^{e} Division légère (DL)) of the 1st Squadron by June 1910. As more modern armored cruisers entered service, they were concentrated in the Mediterranean and Gloire (now the divisional flagship), Amiral Aube and Condé were reunited by January 1911 in the Cruiser Division of the 2nd Squadron, as the Northern Squadron had been redesignated. In March the sisters visited New York City. When the Danton-class battleships began entering service in August, the French Navy reorganized yet again with the 2nd Squadron renumbered as the 3rd and the Cruiser Division was renamed as the 3rd DL by 4 September. Gloire was now the flagship of Rear Admiral Charles-Eugène Favereau. The ship participated in the fleet review by the President of France, Armand Fallières, off Toulon that day. While conducting gunnery training on 20 September, a propellant charge exploded prematurely in one of its 194 mm gun turrets that killed nine and badly wounded another five crewmen. A memorial for the dead was conducted aboard the cruiser five days later. After the Agadir Crisis of 1911, the French and British governments agreed in 1912 that the Royal Navy would defend the northern French coast and the French would concentrate their fleet in the Mediterranean and defend British interests there. The French forces left in the north were consolidated into the 2nd Light Squadron with the 3rd DL redesignated as the 1st Cruiser Squadron. The ship was reassigned to the Atlantic Training Division (Division d'instruction de l'Atlantique) by 10 November 1913 where it served as the flagship of Rear Admiral Auguste-Georges Bouxin.

=== World War I ===
As tensions rose during the July Crisis of 1914, Gloire and the other training cruisers were reactivated and assigned to the 2nd Light Division of the 2nd Light Squadron (Escadre 2^{e} légère) which was tasked to defend the English Channel in conjunction with the British. The 2nd DL was on station in the western end of the Channel by 4 August, where they were tasked to intercept German shipping and provide distant cover to the smaller ships escorting the transports conveying the British Expeditionary Force to France. On 27 October the French patrols in the Channel were reorganized with Rear Admiral François le Canellier aboard Gloire in control of the smaller cruisers now conducting the patrols.

The successes of German merchant raiders like Möwe in 1916 caused the Allies to transfer cruisers to the Atlantic to protect their shipping. Gloire, was temporarily assigned to the 3rd DL when it was sent to Dakar, French West Africa, in February, but returned two months later. After another reorganization in May, Gloire and all of its sisters were assigned to the 3rd DL which was tasked with patrolling the West Indies in search of German commerce raiders. Together with Amiral Aube, Gloire departed Brest on 20 May, bound for Fort-de-France in the colony of Martinique to rendezvous with Marseillaise and Condé which were already there. The armored cruisers were relieved by the 4th DL in September. Möwe and two other raiders began cruises in late 1916. Gloire left Brest in an unsuccessful attempt to intercept Möwe in late December off Halifax and returned on 17 January 1917. Not long afterwards it returned to the West Indies. The 3rd DL was disbanded on 18 May and the remaining cruisers in the West Indies were assigned to the 4th DL which was redesignated as the Atlantic and Antilles Division (Division de l'Atlantique et des Antilles) on 1 June with Gloire as its flagship.

The division was tasked with escorting convoys bound for Europe from Saint Thomas, U.S. Virgin Islands beginning on 15 February 1918. In May the cruiser collided with the American ocean liner SS City of Athens and was sent back to France for repairs. Gloire returned to the West Indies and became flagship again when the division was renamed the Atlantic Division on 25 June. The convoy escort responsibilities were reorganized on 7 July with the French covering convoys from New York City to the Bay of Biscay. It was still assigned to the division when the war ended on 11 November and it escorted the ocean liner SS Leviathan bringing General John Pershing back to the United States on 1 September 1919. The ship was subsequently placed in reserve before it was stricken from the naval register on 7 July 1922 and was sold for scrap in 1923.
