= French cruiser Amiral Aube =

French Navy's Gloire-class armored cruisers

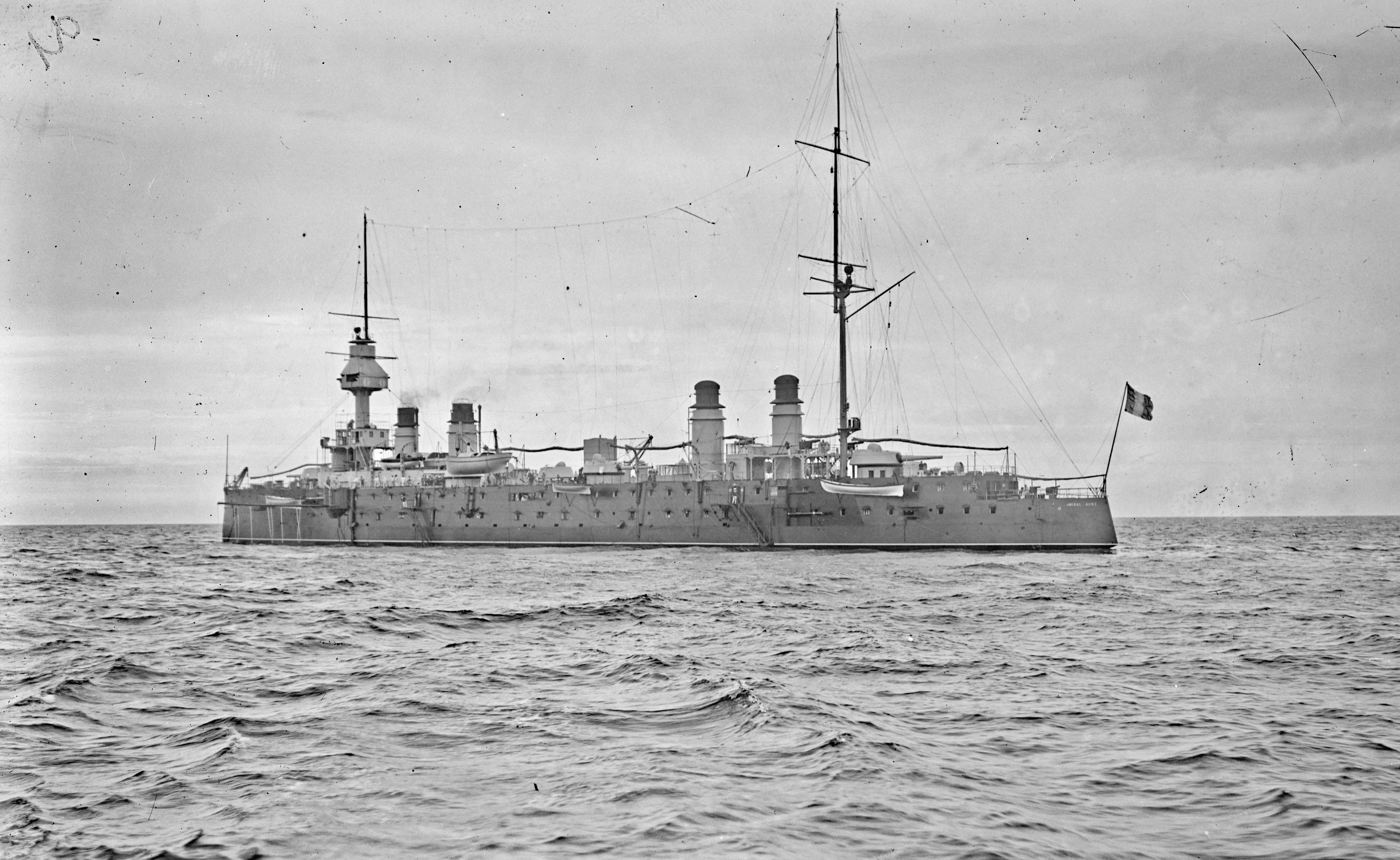
- Amiral Aube in the roadstead of Brest, 10 July 1905

History

France
- Name: Amiral Aube
- Namesake: Théophile Aube
- Builder: Chantiers de Penhoët, Saint-Nazaire
- Cost: FF24,336,000
- Laid down: February 1901
- Launched: 9 May 1902
- Completed: 1 April 1904
- Decommissioned: March 1920
- Stricken: 7 July 1922
- Fate: Sold for scrap, 1924

General characteristics
- Class & type: Gloire-class armored cruiser
- Displacement: 9,996 t (9,838 long tons)
- Length: 139.78 m (458 ft 7 in) (o/a)
- Beam: 20.2 m (66 ft 3 in)
- Draft: 7.55 m (24.8 ft)
- Installed power: 28 Belleville boilers; 20,500 PS (15,100 kW)
- Propulsion: 3 shafts, 3 triple-expansion steam engines
- Speed: 21 knots (39 km/h; 24 mph)
- Range: 6,500 nautical miles (12,000 km; 7,500 mi) at 10 knots (19 km/h; 12 mph)
- Complement: 615
- Armament: 2 × single 194 mm (7.6 in) guns; 8 × single 164.7 mm (6.5 in) guns; 6 × single 100 mm (3.9 in) guns; 18 × single 47 mm (1.9 in) guns; 4 × single 37 mm (1.5 in) guns; 5 × 450 mm (17.7 in) torpedo tubes
- Armor: Belt: 70–150 mm (2.8–5.9 in); Main-gun turrets: 161 mm (6.3 in); Barbettes: 174 mm (6.9 in); Deck: 34–45 mm (1.3–1.8 in); Conning tower: 174 mm (6.9 in)

The French cruiser Amiral Aube was one of five Gloire-class armored cruisers built for the French Navy (Marine Nationale) in the early 1900s. Fitted with a mixed armament of 194-millimeter (7.6 in) and 164.7-millimeter (6.5 in) guns, the ships were designed for service with the battle fleet. Completed in 1904, Amiral Aube joined her sister ships in the Northern Squadron (Escadre du Nord). Unlike her sisters, the cruiser remained in the Northern Squadron until she was placed in reserve in mid-1911. The ship was reactivated at the beginning of 1914 and was assigned to the 2nd Light Squadron (2^{e} Escadre légère), as the units based in northwestern France had been renamed, together with two of her sisters.

When World War I began in August 1914, she was assigned to patrol the English Channel to enforce the blockade of Germany. Amiral Aube was transferred to the Eastern Mediterranean in late 1915 where she patrolled off the coast of Ottoman-controlled territory. To help protect Allied shipping from German commerce raiders, the ship was transferred to the French West Indies in mid-1916. In early 1918, Amiral Aube was briefly assigned to escort convoys from the West Indies to Europe. The ship was sent to Murmansk in March to support Allied forces when they intervened in the Russian Civil War. Returning home in October, she joined her sisters in the Atlantic Division (Division de l'Atlantique) in early 1919. Amiral Aube was placed in reserve in 1920 and sold for scrap four years later.

== Design and description ==
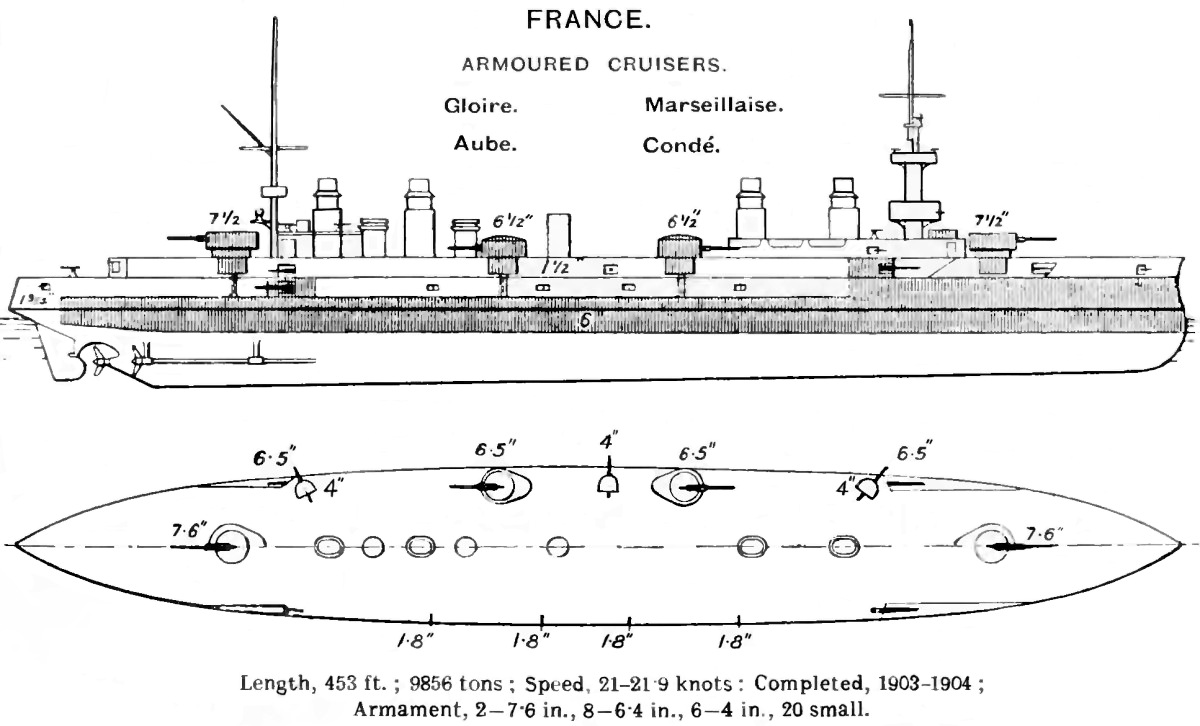
Right elevation and plan of the Gloire-class armored cruisers

The Gloire-class ships were designed as enlarged and improved versions of the preceding Gueydon class by Emile Bertin. The ships measured 139.78 meters (458 ft 7 in) overall, with a beam of 20.2 meters (66 ft 3 in) and a draft of 7.55 meters (24 ft 9 in). They displaced 9,996 metric tons (9,838 long tons). Their crew numbered 25 officers and 590 enlisted men.

The sisters' propulsion machinery consisted of three vertical triple-expansion steam engines, each driving a single propeller shaft, using steam provided by water-tube boilers, but the types of machinery differed between them. Amiral Aube had four-cylinder engines fed by 28 Belleville boilers that were designed to produce a total of 20,500 metric horsepower (15,100 kW) intended to give them a maximum speed of 21 knots (39 km/h; 24 mph). During her sea trials on 12 December 1903, the ship reached 21.88 knots (40.52 km/h; 25.18 mph) from 22,180 metric horsepower (16,310 kW). The cruisers carried enough coal to give them a range of 6,500 nautical miles (12,000 km; 7,500 mi) at a speed of 10 knots (19 km/h; 12 mph).

=== Armament and armor ===
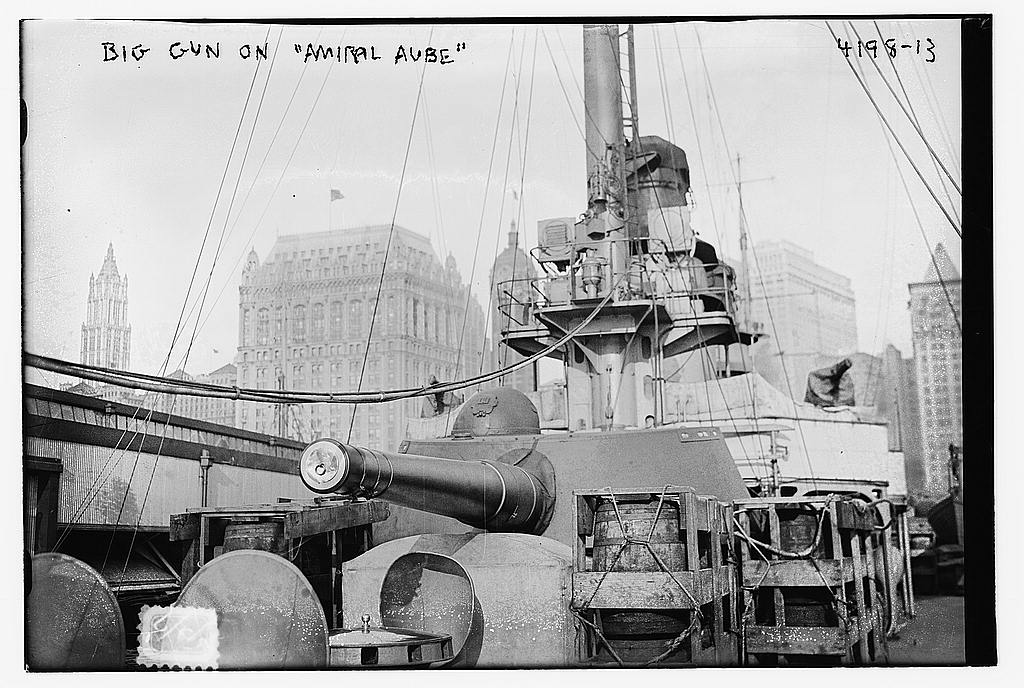
Amiral Aube's aft main-gun turret

The main battery of the Gloire class consisted of two quick-firing (QF) 194 mm Modèle 1893–1896 guns mounted in single-gun turrets fore and aft of the superstructure. Their secondary armament comprised eight QF 164.7 mm Modèle 1893–1896 guns and six QF Canon de 100 mm (3.9 in) Modèle de 1893 guns. Half of the 164.7 mm guns were in two single-gun wing turrets on each broadside and all of the remaining guns were on single mounts in casemates in the hull. For defense against torpedo boats, they carried eighteen 47-millimeter (1.9 in) and four 37-millimeter (1.5 in) Hotchkiss guns, all of which were in single mounts. The sisters were also armed with five 450-millimeter (17.7 in) torpedo tubes, of which two were submerged and three above water. Two of these were on each broadside and the fifth tube was in the stern. All of the above-water tubes were on pivot mounts. The ships varied in the number of naval mines that they could carry and Amiral Aube was fitted with storage for 10.

The Gloire class were the first French armored cruisers to have their waterline armored belt made from Harvey face-hardened armor plates. The belt ranged in thickness from 70 to 150 millimeters (2.8 to 5.9 in). Because of manufacturing limitations, the thinner end plates were nickel steel. Behind the belt was a cofferdam, backed by a longitudinal watertight bulkhead. The upper armored deck met the top of the belt and had a total thickness of 34 millimeters (1.3 in) while the lower armored deck curved down to meet the bottom of the belt and had a uniform thickness of 45 millimeters (1.8 in).

The main-gun turrets were protected by 161 millimeters (6.3 in) of Harvey armor, but their barbettes used 174-millimeter (6.9 in) plates of ordinary steel. The face and sides of the secondary turrets were 92 millimeters (3.6 in) thick and the plates protecting their barbettes were 102 millimeters (4 in) thick. The casemates protecting the 100-millimeter guns also had a thickness of 102 millimeters. The face and sides of the conning tower were 174 millimeters thick.

== Construction and career ==
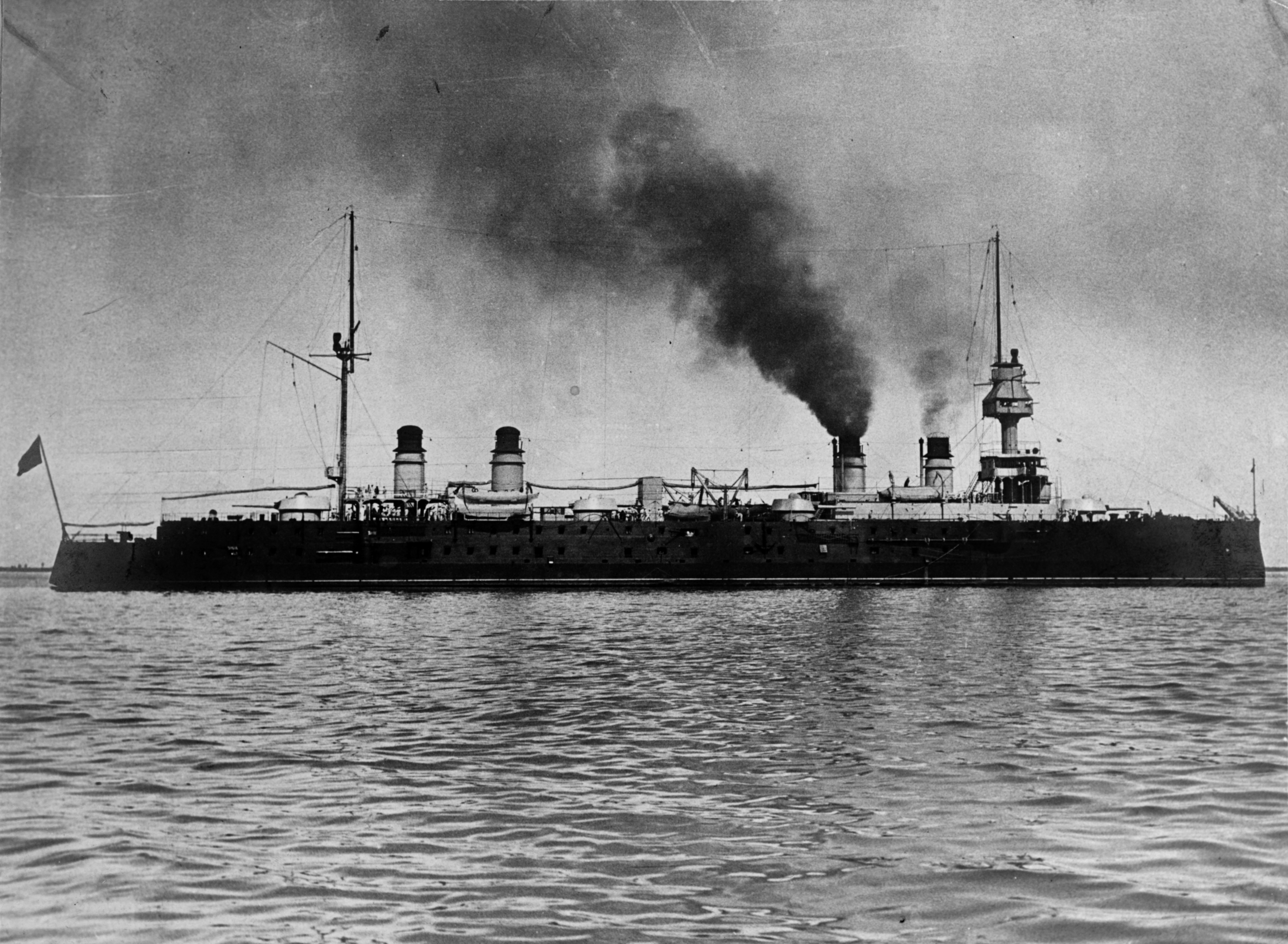
Profile view of Amiral Aube

Amiral Aube, named after Amiral Théophile Aube, was authorized in the 1898 Naval Program and was ordered from Chantiers de Penhoët on 9 August 1899. The ship was laid down in February 1901 at their Saint-Nazaire shipyard, launched on 9 May 1902, and completed on 1 April 1904. The cost of her construction was 24,336,000 francs. On commissioning, most of her crew came from the protected cruiser Guichen, which was paid off into the reserve. The ship was initially assigned to the 1st Cruiser Division (1^{re} Division de croiseurs) of the Northern Squadron. Together with her sisters Condé and Gloire, Amiral Aube escorted the remains of John Paul Jones from France to Annapolis, Maryland, in April 1906 and then went on to visit New York City. and was assigned to the 2nd Cruiser Division by January 1907. Amiral Aube rejoined the 1st Cruiser Division by October and participated in the Quebec Tercentenary in Canada the following July.

When the République-class battleships began entering service in late 1909, the French Navy reorganized and redesignated units so that the division became the Cruiser Division of the 2nd Squadron (2^{e} Escadre). By January 1911, she had been joined by Gloire and Condé. In March the sisters visited New York City. The division was deployed to the Mediterranean for training in mid-1911 and the ship participated in the fleet review by the President of France, Armand Fallières, off Toulon on 4 September. Amiral Aube was assigned to the Reserve Group (Groupe de réserve) in November 1911 and was reactivated in January 1914 as part of the 1st Cruiser Division of the 2nd Light Squadron that replaced the 2nd Squadron.

When World War I began on 3 August, the 1st Cruiser Division was redesignated as the 1st Light Division (1^{er} Division légère (DL)) and transferred to Cherbourg. From there they provided distant cover for the ships enforcing the blockade at the western entrance to the Channel. The 1st DL covered the transports ferrying the British 6th Infantry Division from Southampton to Saint-Nazaire on 9–10 September. On 27 October the French patrols in the Channel were reorganized with Amiral Aube and Gloire tasked to reinforce the smaller cruisers now conducting the patrols.

After the eastern entrance to the Channel was sealed off with anti-submarine nets and minefields in 1915, the armored cruisers were no longer required and Amiral Aube was sent to the Eastern Mediterranean late that year. She arrived on 24 December and was assigned to the 2nd Division of the 3rd Squadron which patrolled off the Egyptian and Levantine coasts. The constant patrolling caused a lot of wear and tear on the ship's propulsion machinery and she required frequent repairs until she was sent to Brest for a refit in March 1916. Two months later, after another reorganization, Amiral Aube and all of her sisters were assigned to the 3rd DL which was tasked with patrolling the West Indies in search of German commerce raiders. Together with Gloire, Amiral Aube departed Brest on 20 May, bound for Fort-de-France in the colony of Martinique. The 3rd DL was disbanded and the remaining cruisers in the West Indies were assigned to the Atlantic and Antilles Division (Division de l'Atlantique et des Antilles) on 1 June 1917. The division was tasked with escorting convoys bound for Europe from Saint Thomas, U.S. Virgin Islands beginning on 15 February 1918.

After the Bolsheviks signed the Treaty of Brest-Litovsk on 3 March 1918, Amiral Aube was sent to North Russia to support the Allied intervention there. The cruiser arrived at Murmansk on 18 March; she supported the Allied occupation of Arkhangelsk on 10 August. The ship returned home in October after being relieved by the armored cruiser Gueydon on the 18th. In early 1919 Amiral Aube was assigned to the Atlantic Division with her sisters. She was placed in reserve in March 1920 in Lorient; the ship was stricken from the naval register on 7 July 1922 and sold for scrap two years later.
