= French cruiser Sully =

French Navy's Gloire-class armored cruiser

Sully
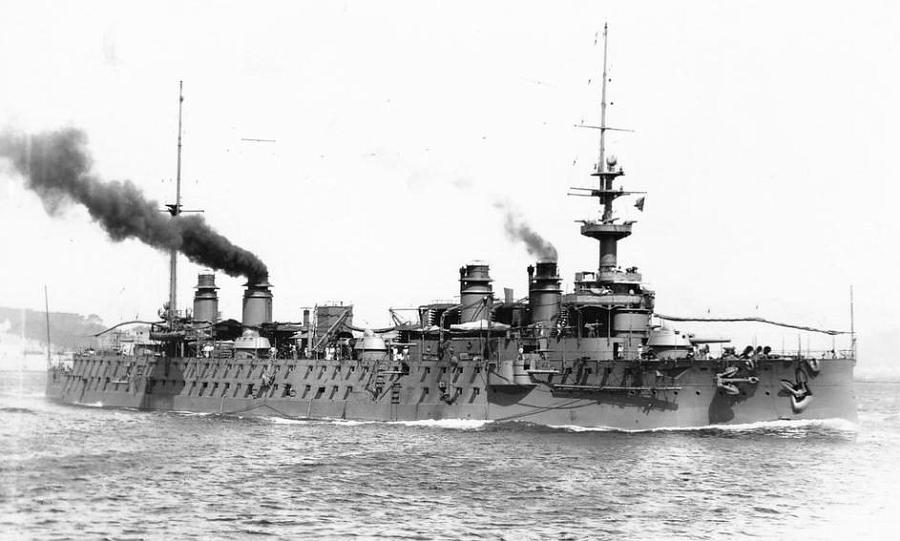
- Sister ship Gloire in 1913

History

France
- Name: Sully
- Namesake: Maximilien de Béthune, Duke of Sully
- Builder: Forges et Chantiers de la Méditerranée, La Seyne
- Laid down: 24 May 1899
- Launched: 4 June 1901
- Completed: June 1904
- Fate: Ran aground and wrecked, 7 February 1905

General characteristics
- Class & type: Gloire-class armored cruiser
- Displacement: 9,996 t (9,838 long tons)
- Length: 139.78 m (458 ft 7 in) (o/a)
- Beam: 20.2 m (66 ft 3 in)
- Draft: 7.55 m (24.8 ft)
- Installed power: 28 Belleville boilers; 20,500 PS (15,100 kW)
- Propulsion: 3 shafts, 3 triple-expansion steam engines
- Speed: 21 knots (39 km/h; 24 mph)
- Range: 6,500 nautical miles (12,000 km; 7,500 mi) at 10 knots (19 km/h; 12 mph)
- Complement: 615
- Armament: 2 × single 194 mm (7.6 in) guns; 8 × single 164.7 mm (6.5 in) guns; 6 × single 100 mm (3.9 in) guns; 18 × single 47 mm (1.9 in) guns; 4 × single 37 mm (1.5 in) guns; 5 × 450 mm (17.7 in) torpedo tubes
- Armor: Belt: 70–150 mm (2.8–5.9 in); Main-gun turrets: 161 mm (6.3 in); Barbettes: 174 mm (6.9 in); Deck: 34–45 mm (1.3–1.8 in); Conning tower: 174 mm (6.9 in)

The French cruiser Sully was one of five armored cruisers of the Gloire class that were built for the French Navy (Marine Nationale) in the early 1900s. Fitted with a mixed armament of 194-millimeter (7.6 in) and 164.7-millimeter (6.5 in) guns, the ships were designed for service with the battle fleet. Completed in 1904, Sully joined her sister ships in the Northern Squadron (Escadre du Nord), although she was transferred to the Far East shortly afterwards. The ship struck a rock in Hạ Long Bay, French Indochina in 1905, only eight months after she was completed, and was a total loss.

== Design and description ==
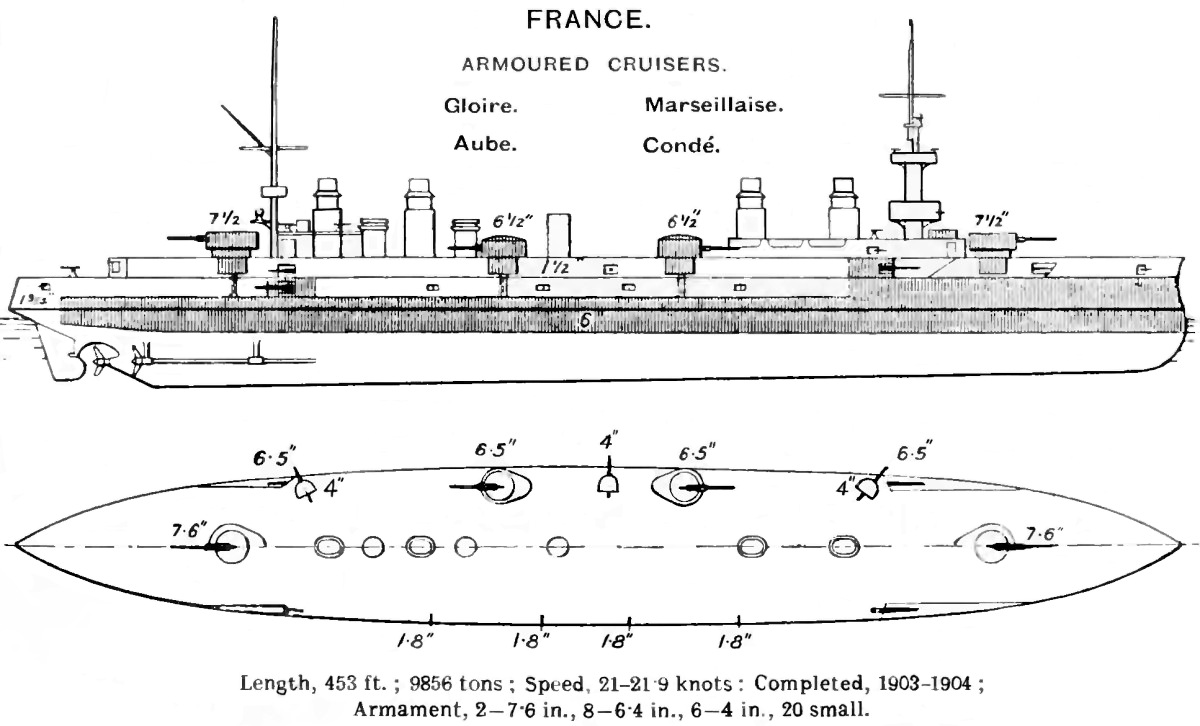
Right elevation and plan of the Gloire-class armored cruisers

The Gloire-class ships were designed as enlarged and improved versions of the preceding Gueydon class by Emile Bertin. The ships measured 139.78 meters (458 ft 7 in) overall, with a beam of 20.2 meters (66 ft 3 in) and a draft of 7.55 meters (24 ft 9 in). They displaced 9,996 metric tons (9,838 long tons). Their crew numbered 25 officers and 590 enlisted men.

The sisters' propulsion machinery consisted of three vertical triple-expansion steam engines, each driving a single propeller shaft, using steam provided by water-tube boilers, but the types of machinery differed between them. Sully had three-cylinder engines fed by 28 Belleville boilers that were designed to produce a total of 20,500 metric horsepower (15,100 kW) intended to give them a maximum speed of 21 knots (39 km/h; 24 mph). During her sea trials on 23 May 1903, the ship reached 21.41 knots (39.65 km/h; 24.64 mph) from 20,110 metric horsepower (14,790 kW). The cruisers carried enough coal to give them a range of 6,500 nautical miles (12,000 km; 7,500 mi) at a speed of 10 knots (19 km/h; 12 mph).

=== Armament and armor ===
The main battery of the Gloire class consisted of two quick-firing (QF) 194 mm Modèle 1893–1896 guns mounted in single-gun turrets fore and aft of the superstructure. Their secondary armament comprised eight QF 164.7 mm Modèle 1893–1896 guns and six QF Canon de 100 mm (3.9 in) Modèle de 1893 guns. Half of the 164.7 mm guns were in two singe-gun wing turrets on each broadside and all of the remaining guns were on single mounts in casemates in the hull. For defense against torpedo boats, they carried eighteen 47-millimeter (1.9 in) and four 37-millimeter (1.5 in) Hotchkiss guns, all of which were in single mounts. The sisters were also armed with five 450-millimeter (17.7 in) torpedo tubes, of which two were submerged and three above water. Two of these were on each broadside and the fifth tube was in the stern. All of the above-water tubes were on pivot mounts. The ships varied in the number of naval mines that they could carry and Sully was fitted with storage for 10.

The Gloire class were the first French armored cruisers to have their waterline armored belt made from Harvey face-hardened armor plates. The belt ranged in thickness from 70 to 150 millimeters (2.8 to 5.9 in). Because of manufacturing limitations, the thinner end plates were nickel steel. Behind the belt was a cofferdam, backed by a longitudinal watertight bulkhead. The upper armored deck met the top of the belt and had a total thickness of 34 millimeters (1.3 in) while the lower armored deck curved down to meet the bottom of the belt and had a uniform thickness of 45 millimeters (1.8 in).

The main-gun turrets were protected by 161 millimeters (6.3 in) of Harvey armor, but their barbettes used 174-millimeter (6.9 in) plates of ordinary steel. The face and sides of the secondary turrets were 92 millimeters (3.6 in) thick and the plates protecting their barbettes were 102 millimeters (4 in) thick. The casemates protecting the 100-millimeter guns also had a thickness of 102 millimeters. The face and sides of the conning tower were 174 millimeters thick.

== Construction and career ==
Sully, named after the statesman Maximilien de Béthune, Duke of Sully, was authorized in the 1898 Naval Program and was ordered from Forges et Chantiers de la Méditerranée on 24 May 1899. The ship was laid down on that same day at their shipyard in La Seyne-sur-Mer, launched on 4 June 1901, and completed in June 1904.

The ship was sent to French Indochina for her first commission. On 7 February 1905 Sully struck a rock in Hạ Long Bay; her crew was not injured. Her guns and equipment were salvaged, but the ship broke in two and was abandoned as a total loss.
