= French cruiser Marseillaise (1900) =

French Navy's Gloire-class armored cruiser

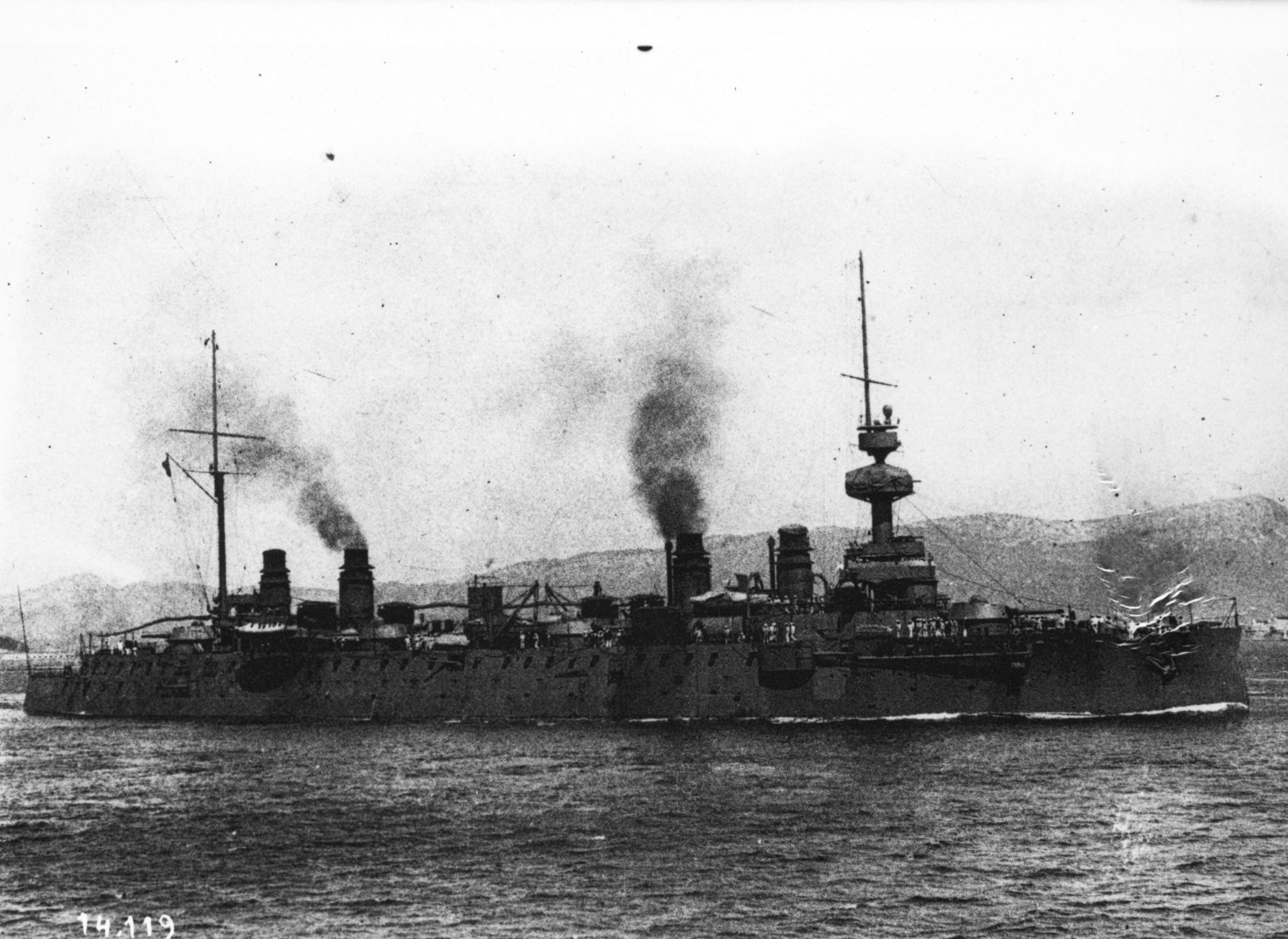
- Marseillaise underway, 1911

History

France
- Name: Marseillaise
- Namesake: La Marseillaise
- Builder: Arsenal de Brest
- Laid down: 10 January 1900
- Launched: 14 July 1900
- Commissioned: October 1903
- Stricken: 1929
- Fate: Broken up, December 1933

General characteristics
- Class & type: Gloire-class armored cruiser
- Displacement: 9,996 t (9,838 long tons)
- Length: 139.78 m (458 ft 7 in) (o/a)
- Beam: 20.2 m (66 ft 3 in)
- Draft: 7.55 m (24.8 ft)
- Installed power: 28 Belleville boilers; 20,500 PS (15,100 kW)
- Propulsion: 3 shafts, 3 triple-expansion steam engines
- Speed: 21 knots (39 km/h; 24 mph)
- Range: 6,500 nautical miles (12,000 km; 7,500 mi) at 10 knots (19 km/h; 12 mph)
- Complement: 615
- Armament: 2 × single 194 mm (7.6 in) guns; 8 × single 164.7 mm (6.5 in) guns; 6 × single 100 mm (3.9 in) guns; 18 × single 47 mm (1.9 in) guns; 4 × single 37 mm (1.5 in) guns; 5 × 450 mm (17.7 in) torpedo tubes
- Armor: Belt: 70–150 mm (2.8–5.9 in); Main-gun turrets: 161 mm (6.3 in); Barbettes: 174 mm (6.9 in); Deck: 34–45 mm (1.3–1.8 in); Conning tower: 174 mm (6.9 in)

The French cruiser Marseillaise was one of five Gloire-class armored cruisers built for the French Navy (Marine Nationale) in the first decade of the 20th century. Fitted with a mixed armament of 194-millimeter (7.6 in) and 164.7-millimeter (6.5 in) guns, the ships were designed for service with the battle fleet. Completed in 1903, Marseillaise joined her sister ships in the Northern Squadron (Escadre du Nord). She was transferred to the Mediterranean Squadron (Escadre de la Méditerranée) the following year where she served as a flagship, but rejoined the Northern Squadron in 1908. Together with two of her sisters, the ship returned to the Mediterranean the following year, but was assigned to the 2nd Squadron (2^{e} Escadre) in 1911, as the units based in northwestern France had been renamed.

When World War I began in August 1914, Marseillaise was assigned to patrol the English Channel to enforce the blockade of Germany and remained on that duty into 1915. She was transferred to the French West Indies later that year where she searched for German commerce raiders and escorted convoys for the rest of the war. The ship served in the Baltic Sea after the war and was reduced to reserve in 1921. Marseillaise was used as a gunnery training ship in 1925–1929 and was broken up in 1933.

== Design and description ==
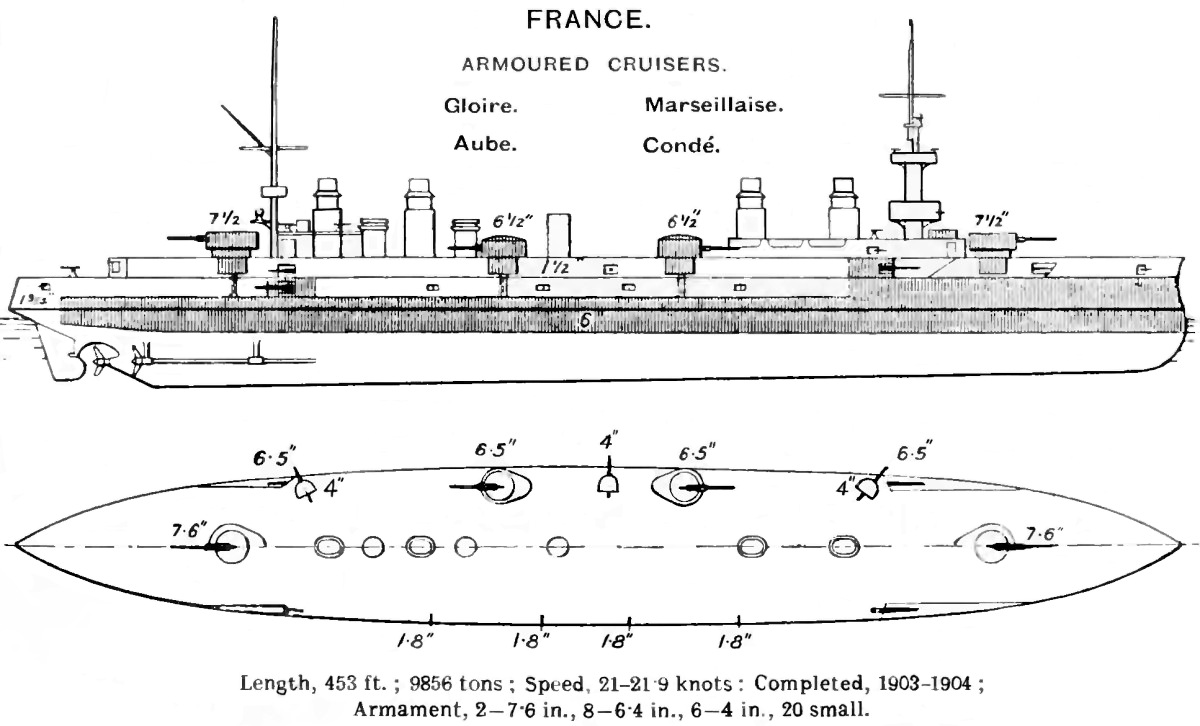
Right elevation and plan of the Gloire-class armored cruisers

The Gloire-class ships were designed as enlarged and improved versions of the preceding Gueydon class by Emile Bertin. The ships measured 139.78 meters (458 ft 7 in) overall, with a beam of 20.2 meters (66 ft 3 in) and a draft of 7.55 meters (24 ft 9 in). They displaced 9,996 metric tons (9,838 long tons). Their crew numbered 25 officers and 590 enlisted men.

The sisters' propulsion machinery consisted of three vertical triple-expansion steam engines, each driving a single propeller shaft, using steam provided by water-tube boilers, but the types of machinery differed between them. Marseillaise had four-cylinder engines fed by 28 Belleville boilers that were designed to produce a total of 20,500 metric horsepower (15,100 kW) intended to give them a maximum speed of 21 knots (39 km/h; 24 mph). During her sea trials on 5 August 1903, the ship reached 21.64 knots (40.08 km/h; 24.90 mph) from 21,805 metric horsepower (16,038 kW). The cruisers carried enough coal to give them a range of 6,500 nautical miles (12,000 km; 7,500 mi) at a speed of 10 knots (19 km/h; 12 mph).

=== Armament and armor ===
The main battery of the Gloire class consisted of two quick-firing (QF) 194 mm Modèle 1893–1896 guns mounted in single-gun turrets fore and aft of the superstructure. Their secondary armament comprised eight QF 164.7 mm Modèle 1893–1896 guns and six QF Canon de 100 mm (3.9 in) Modèle de 1893 guns. Four of the 164.7 mm guns were in two single-gun wing turrets on each broadside and all of the remaining guns were on single mounts in casemates in the hull. For defense against torpedo boats, they carried eighteen 47-millimeter (1.9 in) and four 37-millimeter (1.5 in) Hotchkiss guns, all of which were in single mounts. The sisters were also armed with five 450-millimeter (17.7 in) torpedo tubes, of which two were submerged and three above water. Two of these were on each broadside and the fifth tube was in the stern. All of the above-water tubes were on pivot mounts. The ships varied in the number of naval mines that they could carry and Marseillaise was fitted with storage for 14.

The Gloire class were the first French armored cruisers to have their waterline armored belt made from Harvey face-hardened armor plates. The belt ranged in thickness from 70 to 150 millimeters (2.8 to 5.9 in). Because of manufacturing limitations, the thinner end plates were nickel steel. Behind the belt was a cofferdam, backed by a longitudinal watertight bulkhead. The upper armored deck met the top of the belt and had a total thickness of 34 millimeters (1.3 in) while the lower armored deck curved down to meet the bottom of the belt and had a uniform thickness of 45 millimeters (1.8 in).

The main-gun turrets were protected by 161 millimeters (6.3 in) of Harvey armor, but their barbettes used 174-millimeter (6.9 in) plates of ordinary steel. The face and sides of the secondary turrets were 92 millimeters (3.6 in) thick and the plates protecting their barbettes were 102 millimeters (4 in) thick. The casemates protecting the 100-millimeter guns also had a thickness of 102 millimeters. The face and sides of the conning tower were 174 millimeters thick.

== Construction and career ==
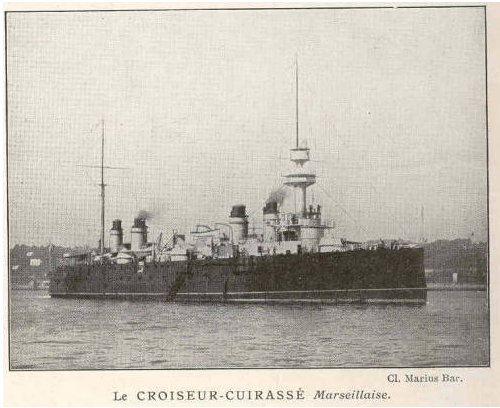
A print showing Marseillaise at anchor

Marseillaise, named after the French national anthem, was authorized in the 1898 Naval Program and was ordered from the Arsenal de Brest on 19 June 1899. The ship was laid down on 10 January 1900, launched on 14 July 1900, and completed in October 1903. The cost of her construction was 22,031,750 francs. Marseillaise was initially assigned to the 1st Cruiser Division (1^{re} Division de croiseurs) of the Northern Squadron. The ship carried President of France Emile Loubet to Naples, Italy, for a state visit in April 1904 and was then transferred to the Light Squadron (Escadre légère) of the Mediterranean Squadron in October. By September 1905, she was flagship of Rear Admiral (Contre-amiral) Paul Campion, commander of the squadron, and remained as such until she was briefly placed in reserve in July 1907.

Marseillaise was recommissioned in January 1908 as the flagship of Rear Admiral Thierry, commander of the 2nd Cruiser Division of the Northern Squadron. Rear Admiral Paul Auvert relieved Thierry by July 1909. After a reorganization in October that saw the Mediterranean Squadron redesignated as the 1st Squadron (1^{re} Escadre) and the Northern Squadron becoming the 2nd Squadron, Marseillaise and her sister Gloire were assigned to the 2nd Light Division (2^{e} Division légère (DL)) of the 1st Squadron. When the Danton-class battleships began entering service in August 1911, the French Navy reorganized yet again with the 2nd Squadron renumbered as the 3rd and the 2nd DL, including Marseillaise, was redesignated as the 3rd DL and assigned to the 3rd Squadron by 4 September. The ship participated in the fleet review by President Armand Fallières off Toulon that day. After the Agadir Crisis of 1911, the French and British governments agreed in 1912 that the Royal Navy would defend the northern French coast and the French would concentrate their fleet in the Mediterranean and defend British interests there. The French forces left in the north were consolidated into the 2nd Light Squadron with the 3rd DL redesignated as the 1st Cruiser Squadron. Rear Admiral Albert Royer hoisted his flag aboard Marseillaise by 10 November 1913.

=== World War I ===
When World War I began on 3 August, the 1st Cruiser Division was redesignated as the 1st Light Division and transferred to Cherbourg. From there they provided distant cover for the ships enforcing the blockade at the western entrance to the Channel. The 1st DL covered the transports ferrying the British 6th Infantry Division from Southampton to Saint-Nazaire on 9–10 September. On 27 October the French patrols in the Channel were reorganized with Marseillaise tasked to reinforce the smaller cruisers now conducting the patrols.

After the eastern entrance to the Channel was sealed off with anti-submarine nets and minefields in 1915, the armored cruisers were no longer required and Marseillaise had been sent to the West Indies by 1916. After another reorganization in May, the ship and all of her sisters were assigned to the 3rd DL which was tasked with patrolling the West Indies in search of German commerce raiders. The 3rd DL was disbanded on 18 May 1917 and the remaining cruisers in the West Indies were assigned to the 4th DL which was redesignated as the Atlantic and Antilles Division (Division de l'Atlantique et des Antilles) on 1 June 1917. Marseillaise escorted a convoy of nine tugboats from Brazil to Agadir, French Morocco, in August and visited Dakar, French West Africa, in September. During the visit, the ship became infested with mosquitoes that led to an outbreak of malaria that infected 420 men of her crew of 520. She was only able to man her two outer engine rooms and only had enough stokers available to reach a speed of 4 knots (7.4 km/h; 4.6 mph). Marseillaise reached her base at Fort-de-France in the colony of Martinique on 12 November, but the epidemic did not end until the following month. The division was tasked with escorting convoys bound for Europe from Saint Thomas, U.S. Virgin Islands beginning on 15 February 1918. It was renamed as the Atlantic Division on 25 June.

Marseillaise was assigned to the Baltic Division (Division de la Baltique) on 18 December 1918 and remained there until she was relieved by the armored cruiser Gueydon in November 1919. In January 1920, she transported 400 French soldiers to Flensburg, as part of the 1920 Schleswig plebiscites. The ship was assigned to the Atlantic Division in March 1920 and was part of the escort on 29 June for the ocean liner SS George Washington as she ferried President of the United States Woodrow Wilson from Europe to the US. Marseillaise was placed in reserve in 1921 and became a gunnery training ship at Toulon in 1925–1929. She was stricken from the naval register in 1929; the ship was renamed Marseilles II on 13 February 1932, condemned that same day and was scrapped at Brégaillon in December 1933.
