= French cruiser Marseillaise =

French cruiser Marseillaise may refer to:

- French cruiser Marseillaise (1900), a Gloire-class cruiser, launched in 1900, stricken in 1929, and scrapped in 1933
- French cruiser Marseillaise (1935), a La Galissonnière-class cruiser launched in 1935 and sunk during World War II
