= Gloire-class cruiser =

French Navy's Gloire-class of armored cruisers

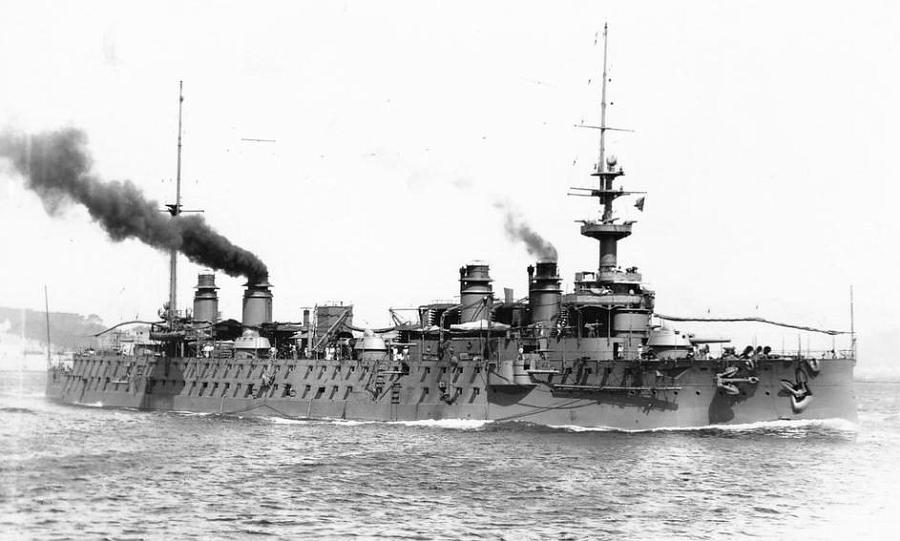
- Gloire in 1913

Class overview
- Name: Gloire
- Operators: French Navy
- Preceded by: Dupleix class
- Succeeded by: Léon Gambetta class
- Built: 1899–1904
- In commission: 1904–1933
- Completed: 5
- Lost: 2
- Scrapped: 3

General characteristics
- Type: Armored cruiser
- Displacement: 9,996 t (9,838 long tons)
- Length: 139.78 m (458 ft 7 in) (o/a)
- Beam: 20.2 m (66 ft 3 in)
- Draft: 7.55 m (24.8 ft)
- Installed power: 28 water-tube boilers; 20,500 PS (15,100 kW)
- Propulsion: 3 shafts, 3 triple-expansion steam engines
- Speed: 21 knots (39 km/h; 24 mph)
- Range: 6,500 nautical miles (12,000 km; 7,500 mi) at 10 knots (19 km/h; 12 mph)
- Complement: 615
- Armament: 2 × single 194 mm (7.6 in) guns; 8 × single 164.7 mm (6.5 in) guns; 6 × single 100 mm (3.9 in) guns; 18 × single 47 mm (1.9 in) guns; 4 × single 37 mm (1.5 in) guns; 5 × 450 mm (17.7 in) torpedo tubes
- Armor: Belt: 70–150 mm (2.8–5.9 in); Main-gun turrets: 161 mm (6.3 in); Barbettes: 174 mm (6.9 in); Bulkheads: 40–100 mm (1.6–3.9 in); Deck: 24 or 25 mm (0.9 or 1.0 in); Conning tower: 174 mm (6.9 in)

The Gloire class consisted of five armored cruisers built for the French Navy (Marine Nationale) during the first decade of the 20th century. Fitted with a mixed armament of 194-millimeter (7.6 in) and 164.7-millimeter (6.5 in) guns, the ships were designed for service with the fleet. After their completion in 1903–1904, the five sister ships were initially assigned to the Northern Squadron (Escadre du Nord), often serving as flagships. Sully was transferred to the Far Eastern Squadron (Escadre de l'Extrême-Orient) shortly afterwards and was wrecked when she struck an uncharted rock in February 1905. Marseillaise and Condé were transferred to the Mediterranean Squadron (Escadre de la Méditerranée) in 1905–1906. The surviving sisters were generally divided between the Northern and Mediterranean Squadrons until a reorganization in 1910 caused all but Amiral Aube to be concentrated in the Mediterranean. The following year another reorganization reduced Amiral Aube to reserve and her sisters were transferred to the 2nd Light Squadron (2^{e} Escadre légère), as the Northern Squadron had been renamed. Gloire became a training ship in 1913 and Amiral Aube was reactivated to replace her. Condé was transferred to the French West Indies in early 1914 where she could monitor events during the Mexican Revolution.

When World War I began in August 1914, the three ships in French waters were assigned to defend Allied shipping in the English Channel and enforce the blockade of Germany while Condé was tasked to hunt down German commerce raiders in the Western Atlantic. Once the defenses of the Channel were completed in 1915, the sisters spent most of the rest of the war patrolling the Atlantic or on convoy escort duties based in either France or the West Indies. Amiral Aube was sent to the Eastern Mediterranean in late 1915 where she patrolled off the coast of Ottoman-controlled territory, but returned to France in early 1916. The ship was sent to Murmansk in early 1918 to support Allied forces when they intervened in the Russian Civil War. Returning home in October, she joined her sisters in the Atlantic Division (Division de l'Atlantique), based in the West Indies, in early 1919.

Marseillaise was assigned to the Baltic Division (Division de la Baltique) on after the war's end in November 1918 and remained there until late 1919. Condé supported Allied forces in North Russia in mid-1919 and covered the evacuation of Allied troops later that year. The Gloire-class ships began to be reduced to reserve in 1920; Amiral Aube and Gloire were stricken from the naval register in 1922 and subsequently sold for scrap. Marseillaise served as a training ship in 1925–1929 and was scrapped in 1933. Condé was converted into a barracks ship in 1925 and was seized by the Germans when they invaded France in 1940. They used her as a submarine depot ship before converting her into a target ship; she was sunk by Allied aircraft in 1944.

== Background ==
By mid-1897 the three factions of the navy, the Jeune École (Young School) that wanted fast, lightly armed ships for commerce raiding, the traditionalists that wanted cruisers to defend the colonies and the modernists who desired armored cruisers and small scout cruisers to operate with the fleet had come to a consensus that armored cruisers could fulfill all these roles. Five cruisers intended to work with the fleet had been authorized in the 1896 construction program and only three, the Gueydon class, would be ordered in 1897. Later that year Navy Minister (Ministre de la Marine) Vice Admiral (Vice amiral) Armand Besnard ordered Louis-Émile Bertin, the Director of Naval Construction (Directeur centrale des constructions navales), to begin design work on an enlarged successor to the Gueydons with an extra 500 metric tons (490 long tons) of displacement.

The 1896 construction program was amended in 1898 to include six more armored cruisers, of which three were intended to be laid down under the 1898 budget. Édouard Lockroy, the new Naval Minister, approved the new design on 17 September and ordered the first two ships from naval dockyards that same day; the remaining three ships were ordered in 1899.

== Design and description ==
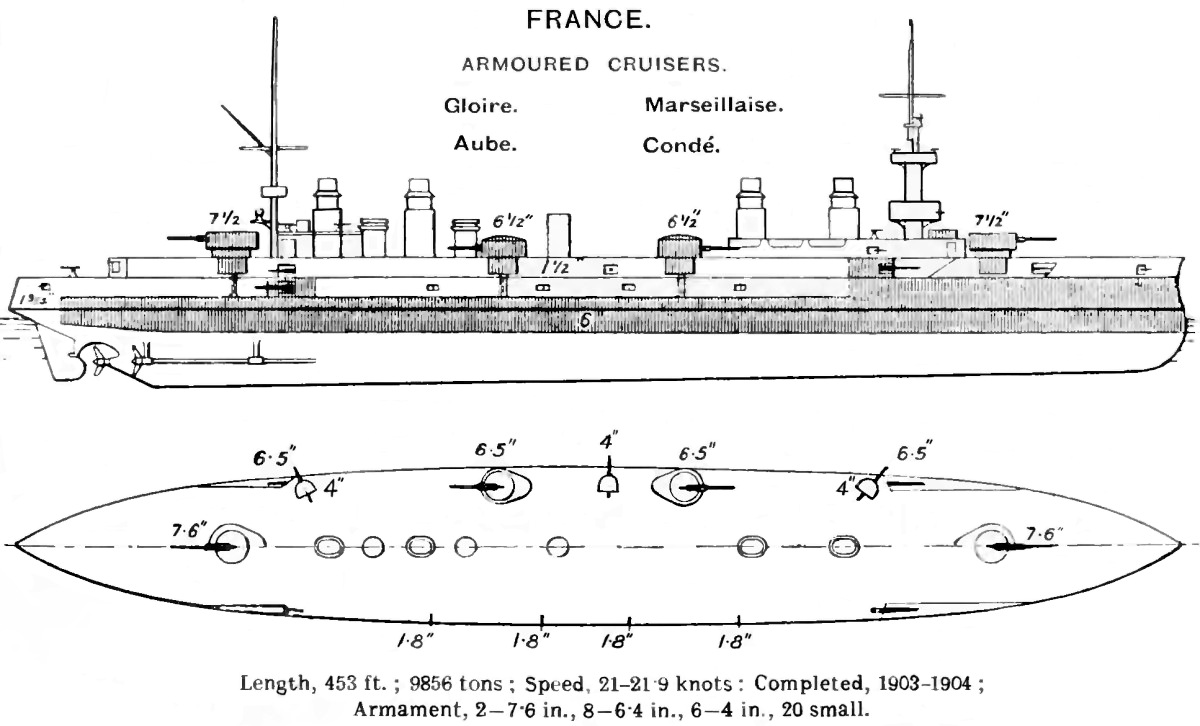
Right elevation and deck plan as depicted in Brassey's Naval Annual 1912

Most of the additional weight allotted to the Gloire-class ships was invested in increasing the height of the waterline armored belt and adding three more torpedo tubes. The ships measured 139.78 meters (458 ft 7 in) overall, with a beam of 20.2 meters (66 ft 3 in) and a draft of 7.55 meters (24 ft 9 in). They displaced 9,996 metric tons (9,838 long tons). Their crew numbered 25 officers and 590 enlisted men.

The ships had three vertical triple-expansion steam engines, each driving one propeller shaft. The engines were rated at a total of 20,500 metric horsepower (15,100 kW), using steam provided by 28 Belleville water-tube boilers, except for Condé and Gloire, which had an equal number of Niclausse boilers. They had a designed speed of 21 knots (39 km/h; 24 mph), demonstrating speeds of 21.27–21.88 knots (39.39–40.52 km/h; 24.48–25.18 mph) from 20,110–22,331 PS (14,791–16,424 kW) during their sea trials. The Gloires carried up to 1,660 long tons (1,690 t) of coal and could steam for 6,500 nautical miles (12,000 km; 7,500 mi) at a speed of 10 knots (19 km/h; 12 mph).

=== Armament ===
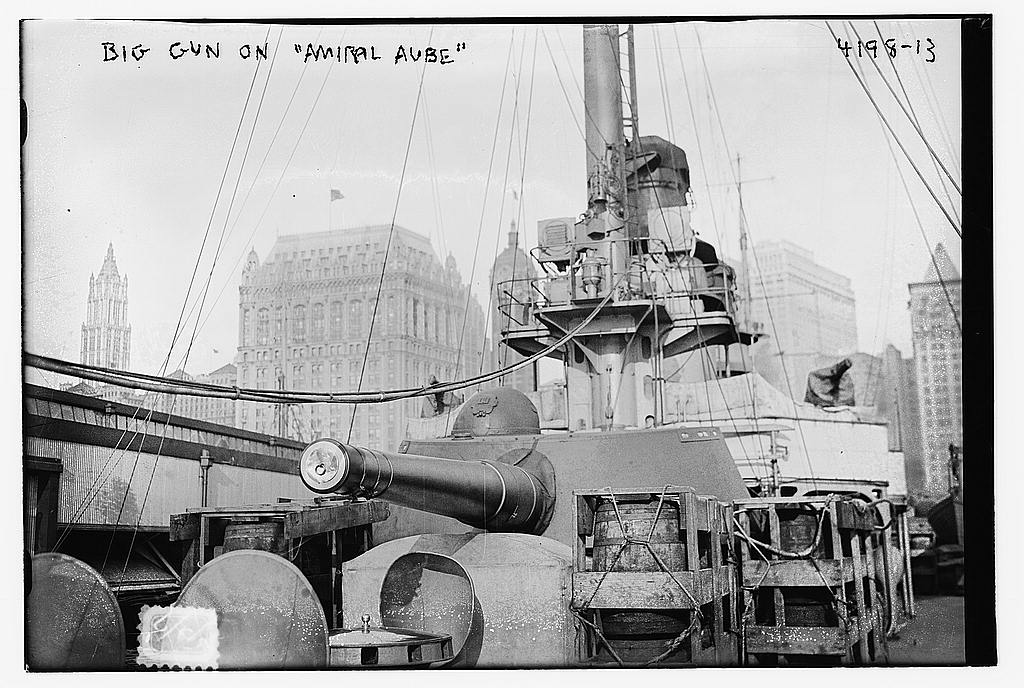
Amiral Aube's aft main-gun turret

The main battery of the Gloire class consisted of two quick-firing (QF) 194 mm (7.6 in) Modèle 1893–1896 guns mounted in single-gun turrets fore and aft of the superstructure. The guns fired 75–90.3-kilogram (165–199 lb) shells at muzzle velocities ranging from 770 to 800 meters per second (2,500 to 2,600 ft/s). This gave them a range of about 11,500 meters (12,600 yd) at the turrets' maximum elevation of +15 degrees. Each gun was provided with 100 rounds which it could fire at a rate of two rounds per minute.

Their secondary armament comprised eight QF 164.7 mm (6.5 in) Modèle 1893–1896 guns and six QF Canon de 100 mm (3.9 in) Modèle de 1893 guns. Half of the 164.7 mm guns were in two single-gun wing turrets on each broadside and all of the remaining guns were on single mounts in casemates in the hull. Their 45–54.9-kilogram (99–121 lb) shells were fired at muzzle velocities of 900 meters per second (3,000 ft/s) at a rate of three rounds per minute. At their maximum elevation of +15 degrees, the guns had a range of 10,800 meters (11,800 yd). The sisters carried 200 rounds for each gun. The 14–16-kilogram (31–35 lb) shells of the 100 mm guns had muzzle velocities ranging from 710 to 740 meters per second (2,300 to 2,400 ft/s). Each gun was provided with 250 rounds, of which a dozen were stowed in the casemates, which it could fire at a rate of six rounds per minute.

For defense against torpedo boats, the Gloire-class ships were fitted with eighteen 47-millimeter (1.9 in) and four 37-millimeter (1.5 in) Hotchkiss guns, all of which were in single mounts. The sisters were also armed with five 450-millimeter (17.7 in) torpedo tubes. One pair was submerged and the other was above water, both firing on the broadside, and the last tube was above water in the stern. All of the above-water tubes were on pivot mounts. The ships carried sixteen torpedoes for them. They could also carry between 10 and 14 naval mines.

=== Armor ===
The Gloire class were the first French armored cruisers to have their waterline armored belt made from Harvey face-hardened armor plates. The belt was arrayed in two strakes, the lower of which had a maximum thickness of 150 millimeters (5.9 in) amidships and thinned to 90 millimeters (3.5 in) towards the bow and 80 millimeters (3.1 in) towards the stern. The upper strake of armor was 130 millimeters (5 in) thick amidships and reduced to 80 millimeters at the bow and 70 millimeters (2.8 in) at the stern. Because of manufacturing limitations, the end plates of both strakes were nickel steel. Behind the belt was a highly subdivided watertight internal cofferdam, backed by a longitudinal watertight bulkhead.

The main-gun turrets were protected by 161 millimeters (6.3 in) of Harvey armor, but their barbettes used 174-millimeter (6.9 in) plates of ordinary steel. The face and sides of the secondary turrets were 92 millimeters (3.6 in) thick and the plates protecting their barbettes were 102 millimeters (4 in) thick. The casemates protecting the 164.7-millimeter guns also had a thickness of 102 millimeters. The face and sides of the conning tower were 174 millimeters thick. The forward transverse bulkhead was 100 mm (3.9 in) thick while the after transverse bulkhead ranged in thickness between 40 and 84 mm (1.6 and 3.3 in). The lower armored deck consisted of mild steel plates 25 mm (0.98 in) thick, both on the flat and where it curved downwards to meet the bottom of the belt. The upper armored deck was at the level of the top of the belt and was made from 24 mm (0.94 in) of hardened steel.

== Ships ==
Construction data
Name	Builder	Laid down	Launched	Commissioned	Fate
Gloire	Arsenal de Lorient	5 September 1899	27 June 1900	28 April 1904	Sold for scrap, 1923
Marseillaise	Arsenal de Brest	10 January 1900	14 July 1900	October 1903	Scrapped, 1933
Sully	Forges et Chantiers de la Méditerranée, La Seyne-sur-Mer	24 May 1899	4 June 1901	January 1904	Wrecked, 8 February 1905
Amiral Aube	Ateliers et Chantiers de la Loire, Nantes	February 1901	9 May 1902	1 April 1904	Sold for scrap, 1924
Condé	Arsenal de Lorient	29 January 1901	12 March 1902	12 August 1904	Sunk by Allied aircraft, 1944; scrapped, 1954

== Service ==
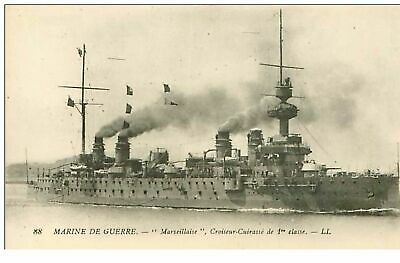
A postcard of Marseillaise

All five of the sisters were initially assigned to the 1st Cruiser Squadron of the Northern Squadron as they commissioned and Gloire became the squadron's flagship. Sully, however, was soon transferred to the Far East where she was wrecked on an uncharted rock in early 1905. Marseillaise and Condé were transferred to the Mediterranean Squadron's Light Squadron (Escadre légère) in 1905 and 1906, respectively while Gloire and Amiral Aube remained with the Northern Squadron for the rest of the decade. Gloire joined Marseillaise and Condé in the 1st Squadron (1^{re} Escadre) in 1910 as the Mediterranean Squadron had been redesignated in 1909. At the same time the Northern Squadron had become the 2nd Squadron.

The entry into service of more modern cruisers saw the sisters transferred back to the 2nd Squadron in 1911. Later that year Amiral Aube was placed in reserve. After the Agadir Crisis of 1911, the French and British governments agreed in 1912 that the Royal Navy would defend the northern French coast and the French would concentrate their fleet in the Mediterranean and defend British interests there. The French forces left in the north were consolidated into the 2nd Light Squadron with Gloire, Condé and Marseillaise assigned to the 1st Cruiser Squadron. In late 1913, Gloire became a training ship and Amiral Aube was reactivated to replace her. Early the following year, Condé was transferred to the Atlantic Division in the French West Indies where she often cruised off the coast of Mexico to protect French citizens and interests during the Mexican Revolution.

=== World War I ===
When World War I began in August 1914, Condé was tasked to search for German commerce raiders and Gloire joined her sisters providing distant cover for the ships enforcing the blockade at the western entrance to the Channel. After the eastern entrance to the Channel was sealed off with anti-submarine nets and minefields in 1915, the armored cruisers were no longer required and Amiral Aube was transferred to the Mediterranean where she patrolled off the Egyptian and Levantine coasts until early 1916. Marseillaise joined Condé in the West Indies before the end of 1915. The successes of German merchant raiders like Möwe in 1916 caused the Allies to transfer cruisers to the Atlantic to protect their shipping and formed the 3rd Light Division (3^{e} Division légère (DL)) from the four surviving sisters in mid-1916 with Gloire as the flagship. Condé preceded her sisters home in July as she badly needed a refit. The 3rd DL was relieved by the 4th DL two months later and returned to France.

New cruises by Möwe and other commerce raiders at the beginning of 1917 caused Amiral Aube, Gloire and Marseillaise to return to the West Indies. The 3rd Light Division was disbanded in May 1917 and the remaining cruisers in the West Indies were assigned to the Atlantic and Antilles Division (Division de l'Atlantique et des Antilles) on 1 June. Condé replaced the armored cruiser Jeanne d'Arc in November and Gloire became the flagship of the division. While visiting Dakar, French West Africa, in September, Marseillaise became infested with malaria-laden mosquitoes that caused 70 percent of her crew to catch the disease. The division was tasked with escorting convoys bound for Europe from Saint Thomas, U.S. Virgin Islands, beginning on 15 February 1918. After the Bolsheviks signed the Treaty of Brest-Litovsk with the Germans on 3 March, Amiral Aube was deployed to Murmansk in March to support Allied forces when they intervened in the Russian Civil War and Condé returned home that same month. During her absence the division was renamed the Atlantic Division in June. Condé was recalled in August after her replacement, the armored cruiser Dupetit-Thouars, was torpedoed and sunk. That month Amiral Aube supported the Allied occupation of Arkhangelsk before departing the Arctic in October.

=== Postwar activities ===
Gloire, Marseillaise and Condé were still assigned to the Atlantic Division when the war ended on 11 November. Gloire remained with the division until mid-1920 and was subsequently reduced to reserve after returning home. Marseillaise was assigned to the Baltic Division (Division de la Baltique) on 18 December 1918 and remained there until she was relieved by the armored cruiser Gueydon in November 1919. Amiral Aube was reassigned to the division in early 1919. Condé had returned to France by 28 May 1919 when the ship transported 176 mutineers from French colonial infantry units from Brest to Casablanca, French Morocco. She relieved Gueydon in the Arctic on 25 June and covered the withdrawal of French troops from Arkhangelsk and the subsequent evacuation of Murmansk by Allied forces on 12 October. Marseillaise and Condé had rejoined the Atlantic Division by March 1920. By this date Amiral Aube and Condé had been placed in reserve. Both Amiral Aube and Gloire were stricken on 7 July 1922 and were subsequently sold for scrap.

Their sisters Marseillaise and Condé had longer careers, albeit in subsidiary roles. The former ship served as a gunnery training ship from 1925 until she was stricken in 1929. Marseillaise was renamed Marseillaise II on 15 February 1932 and scrapped the following year. Condé became a barracks ship for the naval infantry (Fusiliers Marins) at Lorient in 1922. In 1928 the ship hosted the Naval Infantry School (École des fusiliers); she was stricken from the naval register on 15 February 1933, but continued in use. Condé was captured by the Germans in June 1940 who used her as a submarine depot ship. She was sunk by Allied aircraft in 1944 in Bordeaux; her wreck was salvaged ten years later and broken up for scrap.

== Bibliography ==
- Chesneau, Roger & Kolesnik, Eugene M., eds. (1979). Conway's All the World's Fighting Ships 1860–1905. Greenwich, UK: Conway Maritime Press. ISBN 0-8317-0302-4.
- Dai, Wei (September 2020). "A Discussion on French Armored Cruiser Identification: From the Gueydon Class to the Edgar Quinet Class". Warship International. LVII (3): 199–221. ISSN 0043-0374.
- Friedman, Norman (2011). Naval Weapons of World War One: Guns, Torpedoes, Mines and ASW Weapons of All Nations: An Illustrated Directory. Barnsley, UK: Seaforth. ISBN 978-1-84832-100-7.
- Jordan, John & Caresse, Philippe (2019). French Armoured Cruisers 1887–1932. Barnsley, UK: Seaforth Publishing. ISBN 978-1-5267-4118-9.
- Silverstone, Paul H. (1984). Directory of the World's Capital Ships. New York: Hippocrene Books. ISBN 0-88254-979-0.
