= Canon de 194 mm Modèle 1893–1896 =

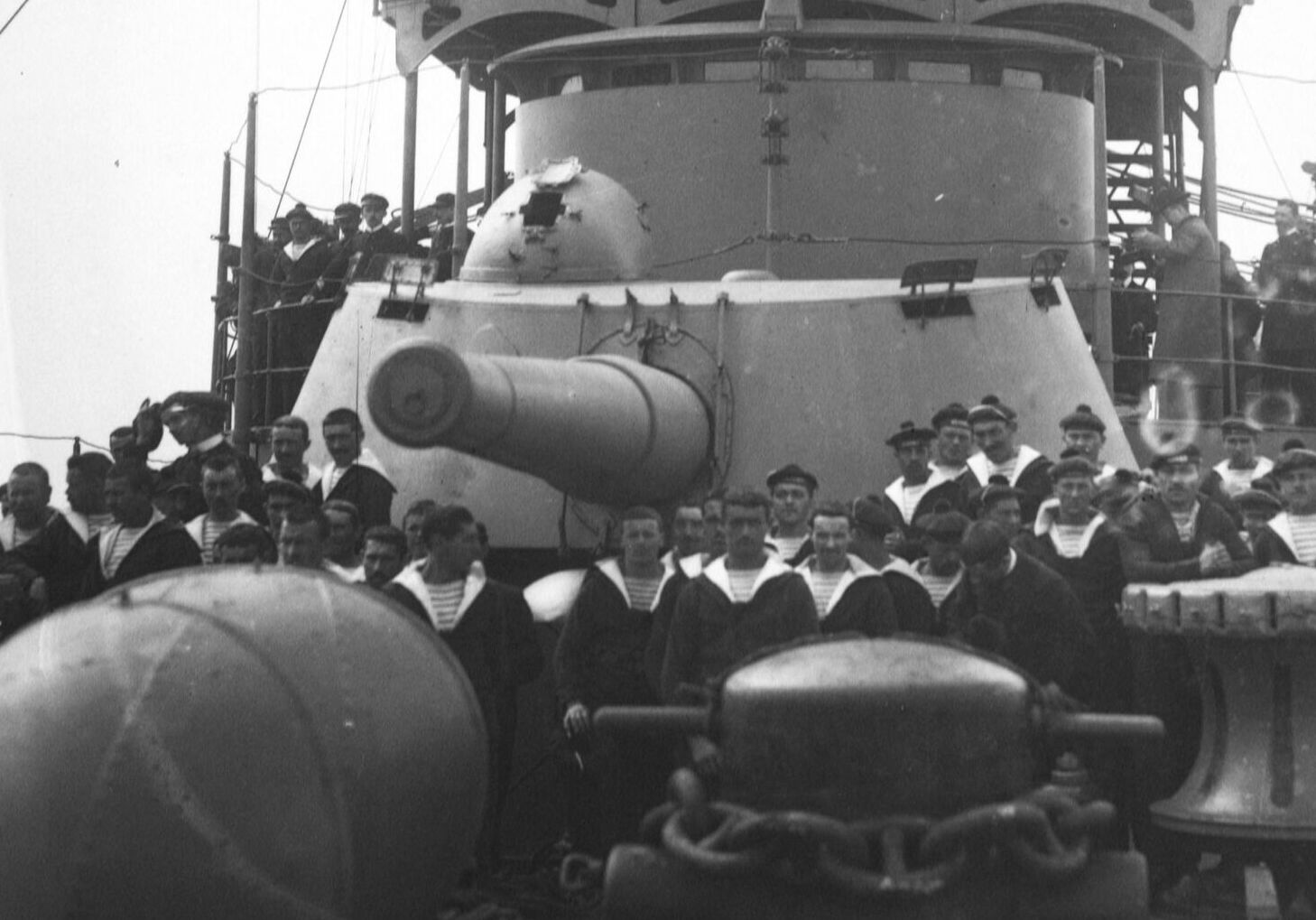
- One of the two single turrets aboard the Gloire.
- Type: Naval gun
- Place of origin: France

Service history
- In service: 1893–?
- Used by: France
- Wars: World War I

Production history
- Designed: 1892
- Produced: 1893–1896

Specifications
- Mass: 12.6 t (13.9 short tons)
- Length: 8.12 m (26.6 ft)
- Barrel length: 7.7 m (25 ft) 40 caliber
- Shell: separate-loading, bagged charge
- Shell weight: 75–90 kg (165–198 lb)
- Caliber: 194 mm (7.6 in)
- Elevation: -6° to +15°
- Traverse: -150° to +150°
- Rate of fire: 2 rpm
- Muzzle velocity: 840–875 m/s (2,760–2,870 ft/s)

The Canon de 194 mm Modèle 1893–1896 was a turret mounted medium-caliber naval gun used as the primary armament of a number of armored cruisers of the French Navy during World War I.

== Design ==
The mle 1893–1896 guns were typical built-up guns of the period with several layers of steel reinforcing hoops. The guns used an interrupted screw breech and fired separate loading bagged charges and projectiles.

== Naval service ==
Ships that carried the Mle 1893–1896 include:

- Gloire class – The primary armament of this class of five armored cruisers consisted of two, 194/40 guns, in single turrets, fore and aft.
- Gueydon class – The primary armament of this class of three armored cruisers consisted of two, 194/40 guns, in single turrets, fore and aft.
- Léon Gambetta class – The primary armament of this class of three armored cruisers consisted of four, 194/40 guns, in twin turrets, fore and aft.
- Jeanne d'Arc – The primary armament of this armored cruiser consisted of two, 194/40 guns, in single turrets, fore and aft.
- Pothuau – The primary armament of this armored cruiser consisted of two, 194/40 guns, in single turrets, fore and aft.

== Ammunition ==
The Mle 1893–1896 used separate-loading ammunition with a bagged charge weighing 33.8-kilogram (75 lb).

Shell type	Weight	Muzzle velocity
Armor-piercing, capped	90 kg (200 lb)	840 m/s (2,800 ft/s)
Common shell	75 kg (165 lb)	875 m/s (2,870 ft/s)
Semi-armor-piercing, capped	89.5 kg (197 lb)	840 m/s (2,800 ft/s)
