= Canon de 164 mm Modèle 1893 =

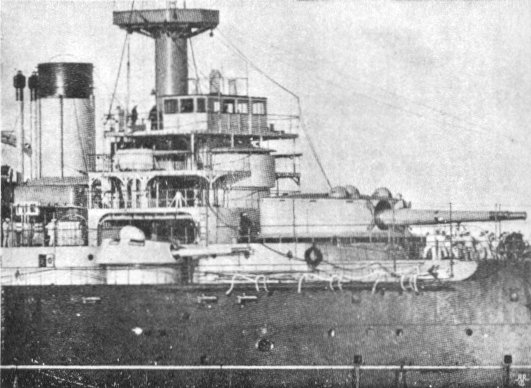
- The single gun Canon de 164 mm Modèle 1893 turret is below and to the left of the main armament on the Suffren
- Type: Naval gun Coastal gun Railroad gun
- Place of origin: France

Service history
- In service: 1893—1945
- Used by: France; Nazi Germany
- Wars: First World War

Specifications
- Mass: 7.04 t (6.93 long tons; 7.76 short tons)
- Barrel length: about 7.412 m (24.32 ft)
- Shell: Separate-loading, bagged charge
- Shell weight: 50.5–52 kg (111–115 lb)
- Caliber: 164.7 mm (6.48 in)
- Breech: Welin breech block
- Recoil: Hydro-pneumatic
- Elevation: about -10° to +25°
- Traverse: depended on mount
- Rate of fire: 2-3 rpm
- Muzzle velocity: 770–775 m/s (2,530–2,540 ft/s)
- Effective firing range: 9,000 m (9,800 yd) at 25°
- Maximum firing range: 18,000 m (20,000 yd) at 36°

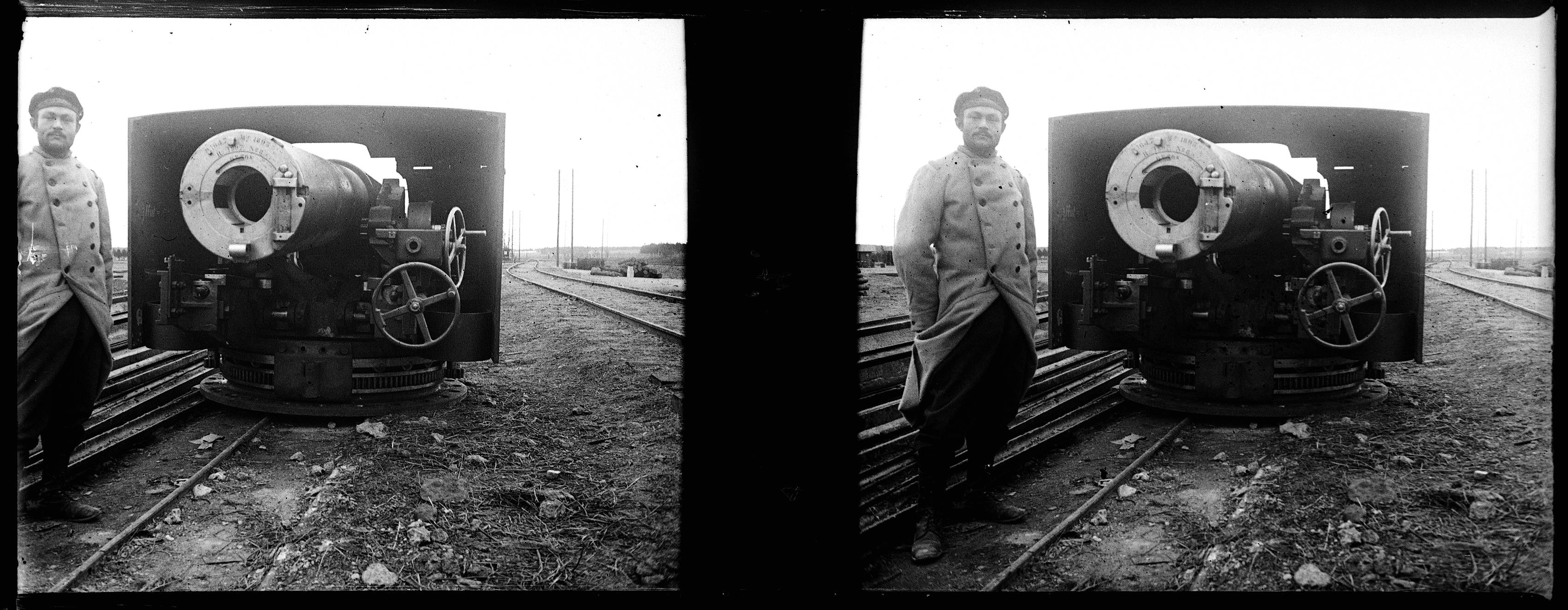
Railroad model, 1916.

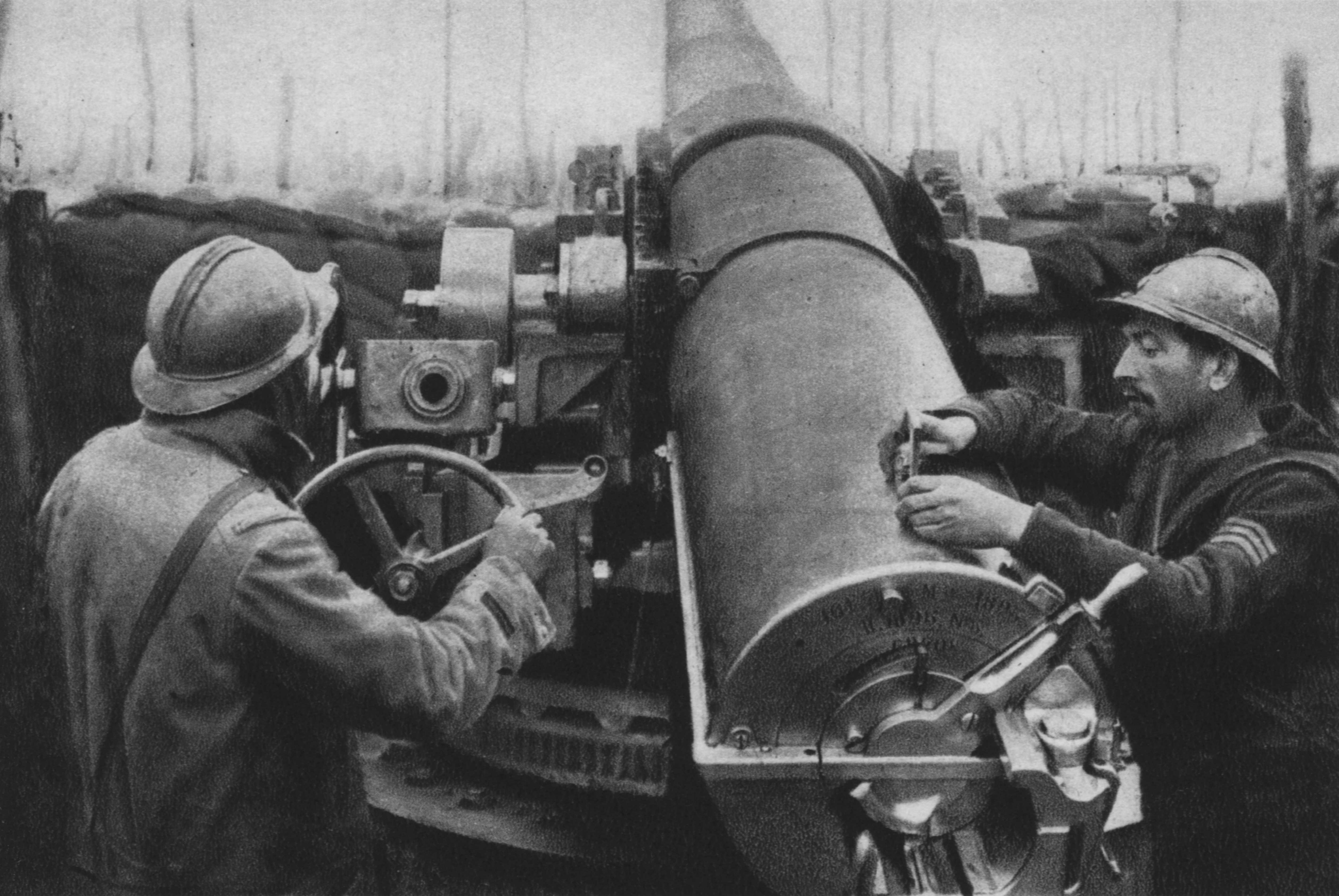
The gun was used on land during WW I (December 1916)

The Canon de 164 mm Modèle 1893 was a medium-caliber naval gun used as the secondary armament of a number of French pre-dreadnoughts and armoured cruisers during World War I. It was used as railway artillery in both World Wars and as coastal artillery in World War II.

== Description ==
The 45 caliber Canon de 164 mm Modèle 1893 gun was a typical built-up French heavy gun of its period. It used a Welin interrupted-screw breech and bagged propellant with a de Bange obturator to get a good gas seal during firing. It was replaced by the Mle 1893/96 gun which used a plastic seal for the obturator, differed in the construction of the gun, had a slightly longer barrel of 46.6 calibers and the newer gun was able to fire a new HE shell further than that used by the older gun.

== Naval mounts ==
The Mle 1893 and 1893/96 guns were mounted in casemated pivot mounts with the ability to depress to -10° and elevate to +25°. The guns fired 52 kg (115 lb) shells at a muzzle velocity of 865 m/s (2,840 ft/s) to a maximum range of 9,000 m (9,800 yd). The guns were also installed in single and twin-gun turrets, although data for the turrets is unavailable.

== Naval service ==
The Mle 1893 was mounted on armored cruisers and pre-dreadnought battleships including:

- Dupleix-class - The primary armament of this class of three armored cruisers consisted of two, Mle 1893 guns, in double turrets, fore and aft.
- Gloire-class - The secondary armament of this class of five armored cruisers consisted of four, Mle 1893 guns, in single casemates, fore and aft. There were also four guns in single turrets in the center of the ship.
- Gueydon-class - The secondary armament of this class of three armored cruisers consisted of eight, Mle 1893 guns, in single casemates, along the ships centerline.
- Léon Gambetta-class - The secondary armament of this class of three armored cruisers consisted of four, Mle 1893 guns, in single casemates, fore and aft. There were also twelve guns in six double turrets in the center of the ship.
- République-class - The secondary armament of this class of two pre-dreadnought battleships consisted of eight, Mle 1893 guns, in single casemates, along each side There were also twelve guns in six double turrets in the center of the ship.

== Railroad gun ==
The French placed a number of spare Mle 1893 guns on four-axle railroad carriages in 1915 to use as mobile heavy artillery under the designation Canon de 164 modèle 1893/96 TAZ. The mount with its gun weighed 60 t (59 long tons; 66 short tons) and was 14.7 m (48 ft) long. It could traverse a full 360° if its outriggers, two per side, were deployed. Photographic evidence shows that some mounts had built-up cargo compartments at both ends of the mount, which limited the gun's firing arc to approximately 90° on each side. It had a circular platform for the crew that had to be folded up for travel. Some guns were fitted with gun shields. It shared its railroad carriage with the 164 mm Mle 1893/96 M and the Canon de 19 modèle 1870/93 TAZ.

The gun could elevate to a maximum of 36°, but the minimum firing angle was 10°. It could fire a 50.5 kg (111 lb) high-explosive shell at a velocity of 775 m/s (2,540 ft/s) to a range of 18,000 m (20,000 yd) or a 52.6 kg (116 lb) armour-piercing shell at a velocity of 770 m/s (2,500 ft/s) to a range of 15,400 m (16,800 yd).

A number of Mle 1893/96 M guns were fitted to the same railroad carriage as the older model in 1917, although it only weighed 60 tonnes (59 long tons; 66 short tons). The gun could elevate between +3° and 40°, but retained the same minimum firing elevation of 10°. It could use the same ammunition as the older guns, but could also fire a new 49.8 kg (110 lb) high-explosive shell fitted with a ballistic cap at a velocity of 830 m/s (2,700 ft/s) to a range of 19,200 m (21,000 yd). Eight of these railroad guns remained in French service after the end of World War I and at least four were captured by the Germans and given the designation 16 cm Kanone (E.) 453(f) although what use was made of them, if any, is unknown.

== Coastal gun ==
The Germans used 32 of the Mle 1893/96 in coast-defence batteries in France as the KM 93/96(f), as well as 18 of the Mle 1893 with the designation of SKL/45(f), although it is unknown how many, if any, were simply taken over from existing French coast-defence positions or were newly emplaced by them.
