= Covering force =

Military force

A covering force is a military force tasked with operating in conjunction with a larger force, with the role of providing a strong protective outpost line (including operating in advance of the main force), searching for and attacking enemy forces or defending the main force from attack.

The United States Army field manual "FM 3-90.6 Brigade Combat Team" provides the following definition of the role of a covering force:

A covering force is a self-contained force capable of operating independently of the main body, unlike a screening or guard force. A covering force, or portions of it, often becomes decisively engaged with enemy forces. Therefore, the covering force must have sufficient combat power to engage the enemy and accomplish its mission. A covering force develops the situation earlier than a screen or a guard force. It fights longer and more often and defeats larger enemy forces.

...

A covering force accomplishes all the tasks of screening and guard forces. A covering force for a stationary force performs a defensive mission, while a covering force for a moving force generally conducts offensive actions. A covering force usually operates forward of the main body in the offense or defense, or to the rear for a retrograde operation. Unusual circumstances could dictate a flank covering force, but this is usually a screen or guard mission. An offensive covering force seizes the initiative early for the main body commander enabling him to attack decisively. When the main body commander perceives a significant enemy to one of his flanks, he usually establishes a flank covering force. That force conducts its mission in much the same way as a flank guard performs its mission. The main differences between the two missions are the scope of operations and the distance the covering force operates away from the main body.

During World War II, the main body of the British Home Fleet regularly sortied into the Norwegian Sea and provided a heavy covering force to protect Arctic convoys from attack by German warships stationed in occupied Norway. The Battle of Driniumor River is also an example of a covering force action.
