= Gueydon-class cruiser =

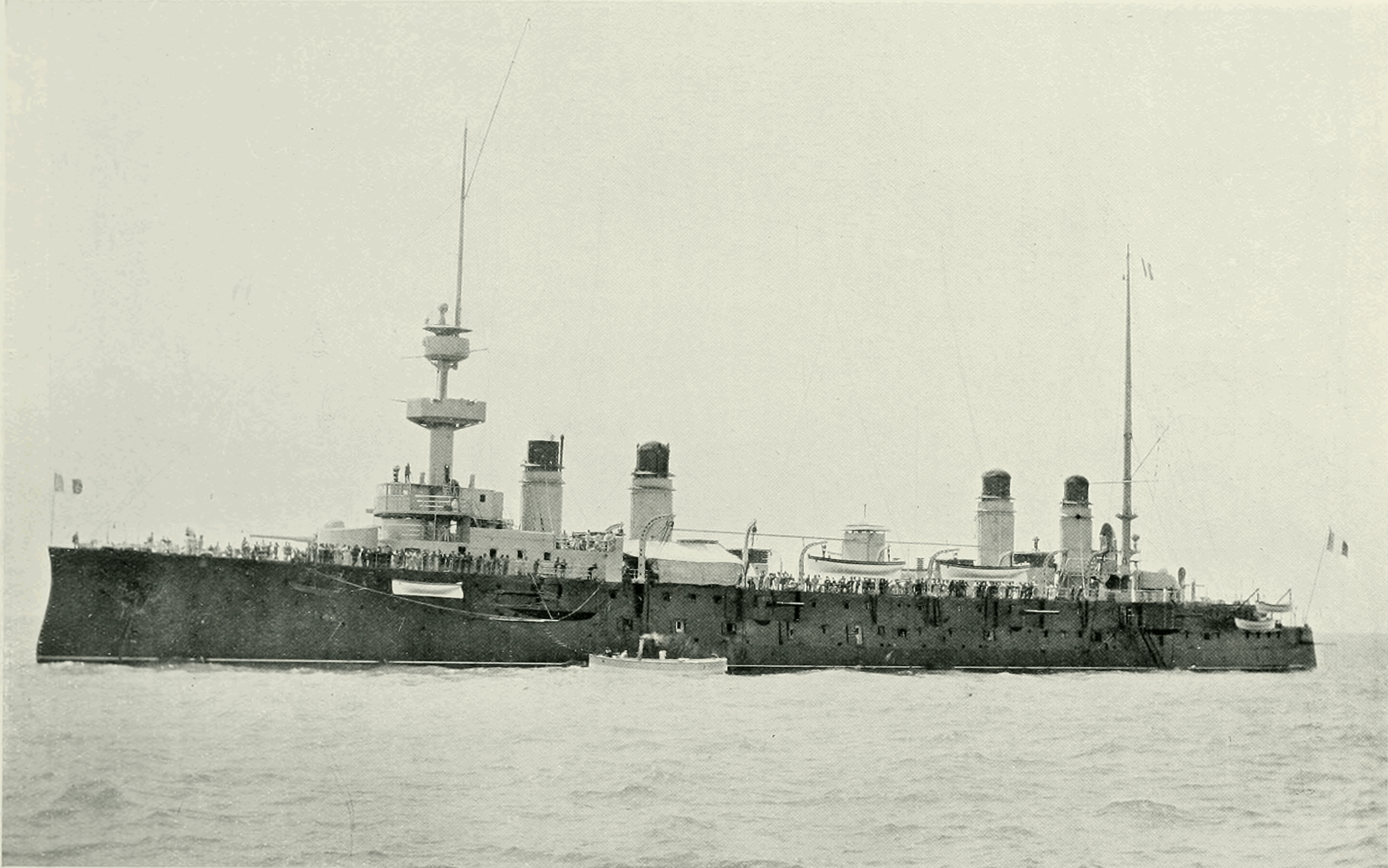
- Montcalm at anchor, 1902

Class overview
- Name: Gueydon
- Operators: French Navy
- Preceded by: Jeanne d'Arc
- Succeeded by: Dupleix class
- In commission: 1902–35
- Completed: 3
- Lost: 1
- Scrapped: 2

General characteristics
- Type: Armored cruiser
- Displacement: 9,516 tonnes
- Length: 139.90 m (459.0 ft)
- Propulsion: 3 engines and 3 propellers, 21500 HP
- Speed: 21.4 knots (39.6 km/h; 24.6 mph)
- Armament: 2 × single 194 mm (7.6 in) guns; 8 × single 164 mm (6.5 in) guns; 4 × single 100 mm (3.9 in) guns; 10 × single 47 mm (1.9 in) guns; 4 × single 37 mm (1.5 in) guns; 2 × 450 mm (17.7 in) torpedo tubes

The Gueydon-class cruiser was a three-ship class of armored cruisers built in the first decade of the twentieth century for the French Navy (Marine Navale).

== Design and description ==
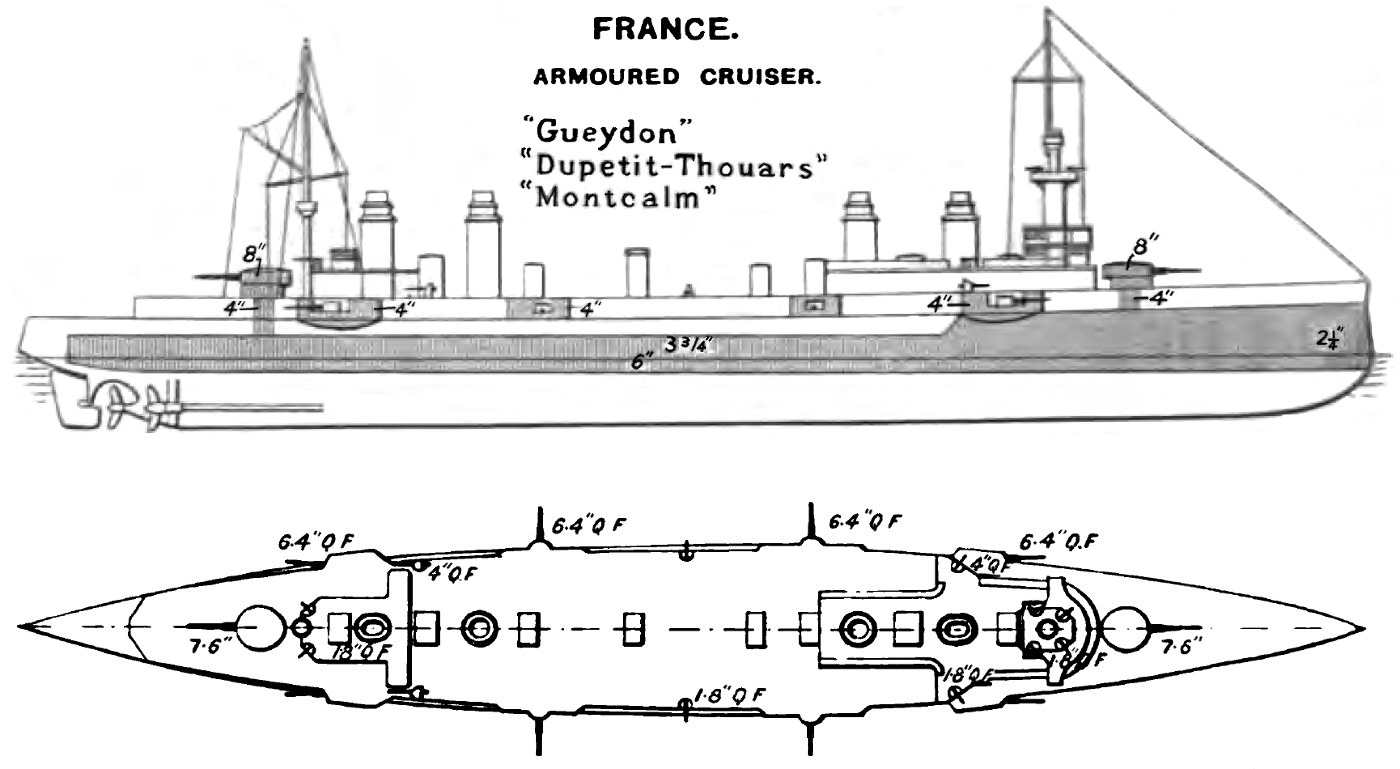
Right elevation and deck plan as depicted in Brassey's Naval Annual 1906

Designed by the naval architect Emile Bertin, the Gueydon-class ships were intended to be smaller and cheaper than the preceding armored cruiser design, Jeanne d'Arc. Like the older ship, they were intended to fill the commerce-raiding strategy of the Jeune École. The ships measured 137.97 meters (452 ft 8 in) long overall with a beam of 19.38 meters (63 ft 7 in) and had a maximum draft of 7.67 meters (25 ft 2 in). They displaced 9,367 metric tons (9,219 long tons). They had a crew of 566 officers and enlisted men.

The Gueydon class had three vertical triple-expansion steam engines, each driving a single propeller shaft. Steam for the engines was provided by 20 or 28 boilers and they were rated at a total of 19,600–22,000 indicated horsepower (14,600–16,400 kW) that gave them a speed of 21–22 knots (39–41 km/h; 24–25 mph). The ships carried up to 1,575 metric tons (1,550 long tons; 1,736 short tons) of coal and could steam for 8,500 nautical miles (15,700 km; 9,800 mi) at a speed of 10 knots (19 km/h; 12 mph).

The ships of the Gueydon class had a main armament that consisted of two 40-caliber 194 mm (7.6 in) guns that were mounted in single gun turrets, one each fore and aft of the superstructure. Their secondary armament comprised eight 45-caliber quick-firing (QF) 164 mm (6.5 in) guns in casemates. For anti-torpedo boat defense, they carried four 45-caliber QF 100 mm (3.9 in) guns on the forecastle deck, ten QF 47 mm (1.9 in) and four QF 37 mm (1.5 in) Hotchkiss guns. They were also armed with two submerged 450-millimeter (17.7 in) torpedo tubes.

The Harvey armor belt of the Gueydon-class cruisers extended from 1.3 meters (4 ft 5 in) below the waterline to the main deck. It reached the upper deck for a length of 43.0 meters (141 ft) from the bow and covered the entire length of the ship except for 4.0 meters (13 ft) of the stern where it ended in a transverse bulkhead 84–41 millimeters (3.3–1.6 in) thick. The lower strake of armor was generally 150 millimeters (5.9 in) thick, although it reduced to 91 millimeters (3.6 in) forward, 81 millimeters (3.2 in) aft, and thinned to 51 millimeters (2 in) at its lower edge. The upper strake of armor had thicknesses of 97–81 millimeters (3.8–3.2 in) and 56–41 millimeters (2.2–1.6 in) between the main and upper decks.

The curved lower protective deck ranged in thickness from 2 to 2.2 inches. In addition there was a light armor deck 20 millimeters (0.8 in) thick at the top of the lower armor strake. A watertight internal cofferdam, filled with cellulose, stretched between these two decks. The gun turrets were protected by 160–176-millimeter (6.3–6.9 in) armor and had roofs 23 millimeters (0.9 in) thick. Their ammunition hoists had 2 inches of armor and the 100-millimeter guns were protected by gun shields. The sides of the conning tower were 160 millimeters thick. The forward end of the casemate compartment was closed off by a 120-millimeter (4.7 in) bulkhead and a 102-millimeter (4 in) bulkhead extended down to the lower deck at the rear end of the compartment.

== Ships ==
Construction data
Name	Builder	Laid down	Launched	Commissioned	Fate
Gueydon	Arsenal de Lorient	13 August 1898	20 September 1899	1 September 1903	Sunk by aircraft, 27 August 1944
Montcalm	Forges et Chantiers de la Méditerranée, La Seyne-sur-Mer	27 September 1898	27 March 1900	20 March 1902	Sunk by aircraft, 16 August 1944
Dupetit-Thouars	Arsenal de Toulon	17 April 1899	5 July 1901	28 August 1905	Torpedoed and sunk by SM U-62, 8 August 1918

== Bibliography ==
- Campbell, N. J. M. (1979). "France". In Chesneau, Roger & Kolesnik, Eugene M. (eds.). Conway's All the World's Fighting Ships 1860–1905. Greenwich: Conway Maritime Press. pp. 283–333. ISBN 0-8317-0302-4.
- Couhat, Jean Labayle (1974). French Warships of World War I. London: Ian Allan. ISBN 0-7110-0445-5.
- Dai, Wei (September 2020). "A Discussion on French Armored Cruiser Identification: From the Gueydon Class to the Edgar Quinet Class". Warship International. LVII (3): 199–221. ISSN 0043-0374.
- Friedman, Norman (2011). Naval Weapons of World War One: Guns, Torpedoes, Mines and ASW Weapons of All Nations: An Illustrated Directory. Barnsley, UK: Seaforth. ISBN 978-1-84832-100-7.
- Jordan, John & Caresse, Philippe (2019). French Armoured Cruisers 1887–1932. Barnsley, UK: Seaforth Publishing. ISBN 978-1-5267-4118-9.
- Roberts, Stephen S. (2021). French Warships in the Age of Steam 1859–1914: Design, Construction, Careers and Fates. Barnsley, UK: Seaforth Publishing. ISBN 978-1-5267-4533-0.
- Silverstone, Paul H. (1984). Directory of the World's Capital Ships. New York: Hippocrene Books. ISBN 0-88254-979-0.
- Sondhaus, Lawrence (2014). The Great War at Sea: A Naval History of the First World War. Cambridge: Cambridge University Press. ISBN 978-1-107-03690-1.
