= HMS Northampton (1876) =

19th century british Military Ship

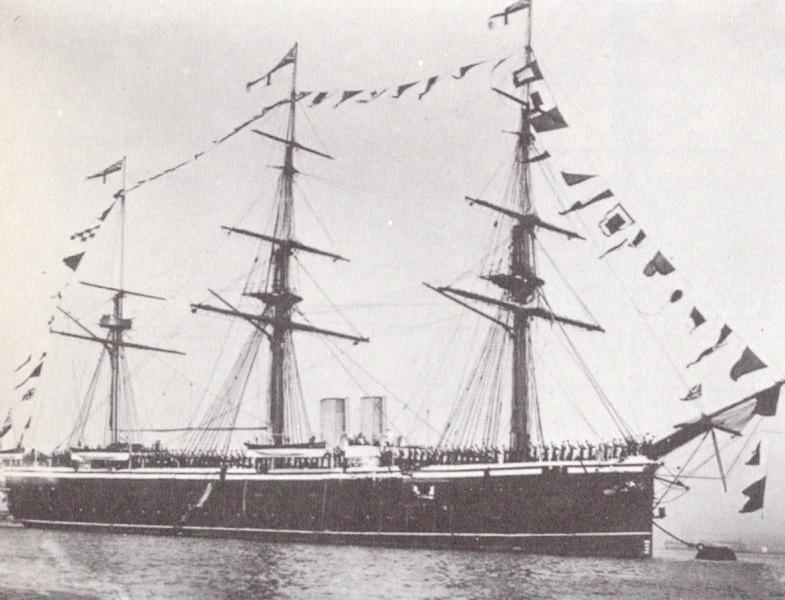
- HMS Northampton is dressed overall in this photograph of her as she appeared after the addition of a fighting top to her mizzen during her 1889–1891 refit.

History

United Kingdom
- Name: HMS Northampton
- Builder: Robert Napier and Sons, Govan
- Laid down: 26 October 1874
- Launched: 18 November 1876
- Commissioned: 1881
- Reclassified: Training ship, June 1894
- Fate: Sold for scrap, 4 April 1905

General characteristics
- Class & type: Nelson-class armoured cruiser
- Displacement: 7,630 long tons (7,750 t)
- Length: 280 ft (85 m) (p/p)
- Beam: 60 ft (18 m)
- Draught: 23 ft 9 in (7.24 m)
- Propulsion: 2 shafts, 2 compound-expansion steam engines
- Speed: 14 knots (26 km/h; 16 mph)
- Complement: 560
- Armament: 4 × 10-inch (254 mm) rifled muzzle-loading guns (RML); 8 × 9-inch (229 mm) RML guns; 6 × 20 pdr guns
- Armour: Belt: 6–9 in (152–229 mm)

HMS Northampton was a Nelson-class armoured cruiser built for the Royal Navy in the 1870s. She was sold for scrap in 1905.

== Design and description ==
The Nelson-class ships were designed as enlarged and improved versions of HMS Shannon to counter the threat of enemy armoured ships encountered abroad. The ships had a length between perpendiculars of 280 feet (85.3 m), a beam of 60 feet (18.3 m), and a deep draught of 25 feet 9 inches (7.8 m). Northampton displaced 7,630 long tons (7,750 t), about 2,000 long tons (2,000 t) more than Shannon. The steel-hulled ships were fitted with a ram, and their crew numbered approximately 560 officers and other ranks.

The ship had two 3-cylinder, inverted compound steam engines, each driving a single propeller, using steam provided by 10 oval boilers. The cylinders of the Northampton's engines could be adjusted in volume to optimize steam production depending on the demand. They were troublesome throughout the ship's life and she was always about 1 knot (1.9 km/h; 1.2 mph) slower than her sister despite repeated efforts to improve her speed. The engines produced 6,073 indicated horsepower (4,529 kW) and she failed to achieve her designed speed of 14 knots (26 km/h; 16 mph) on her sea trials, only making 13.17 knots (24.39 km/h; 15.16 mph). The Nelson-class ships carried a maximum of 1,150 long tons (1,170 t) of coal, which gave them an economical range of 5,000 nautical miles (9,300 km; 5,800 mi) at a speed of 12.5 knots (23.2 km/h; 14.4 mph). They were barque-rigged with three masts.

== Construction and career ==
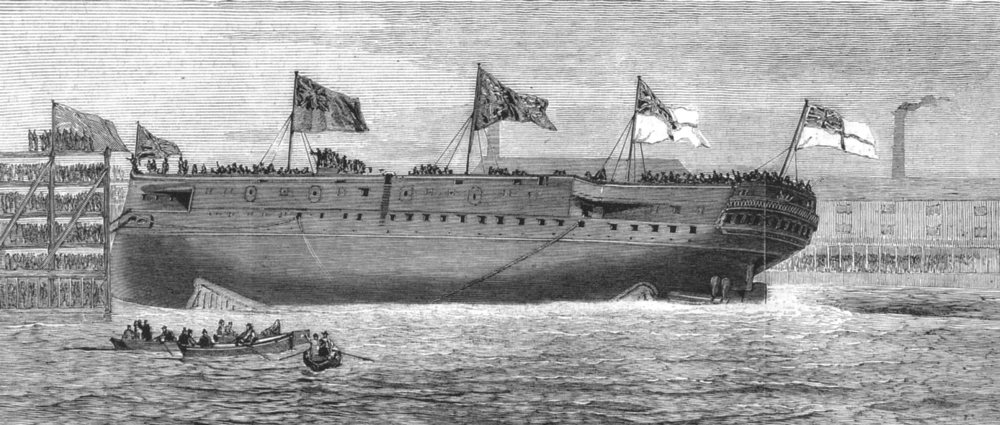
Launch of the Northampton at Glasgow. The Graphic 1876

Northampton, named after the eponymous town, was laid down by Robert Napier and Sons at their shipyard in Govan, Scotland, launched on 18 December 1876, and completed on 7 December 1879.

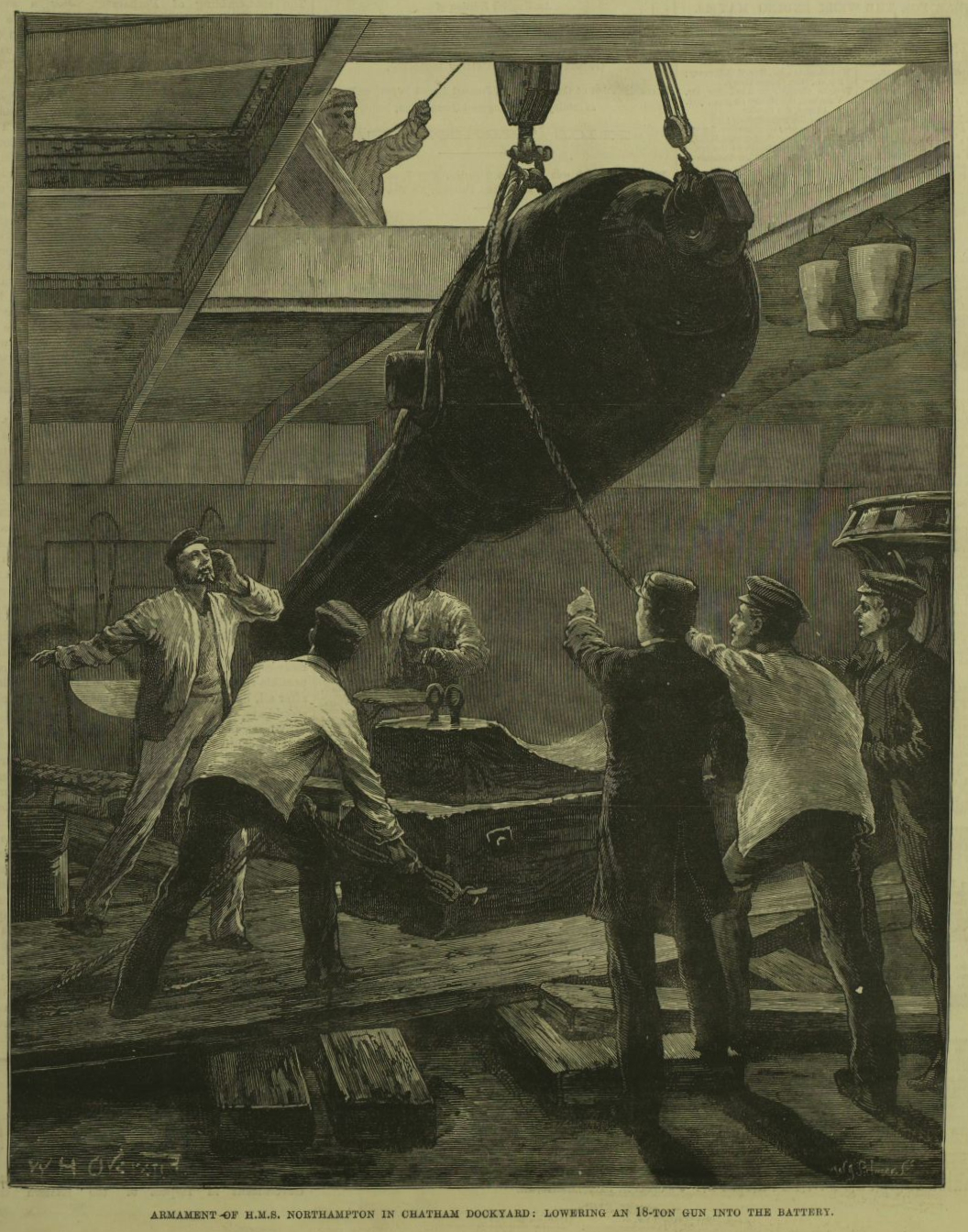
The Northampton in Chatham Dockyard, lowering an 18-Ton Gun into the Battery in 1878. Illustrated London News 1878

Northampton was the flagship of the North America and West Indies Station until she was placed in reserve in 1886. She was hulked as a boys' training ship in 1894 and used in home waters.

Captain Herbert Arthur Walton Onslow was in command from July 1897 to February 1902. After a refit in late 1899, she left in March 1900 for an extended recruiting cruise until August that year, visiting Portsmouth, Plymouth, Queenstown, Tarbert, Foynes, Lough Swilly, Campbeltown, Holyhead, and Torbay. In November 1901, she put up at Chatham Dockyard for alterations and a refit, and was not finished until June the following year, when she was back as a training cruiser. Captain William G. White was in command in 1902, when she took part in the fleet review held at Spithead on 16 August 1902 for the coronation of King Edward VII. Captain Arthur John Horsley was appointed in command in October 1902. She was sold for breaking up in 1905 to Thos. W. Ward, of Morecambe.
