= HMS Nelson (1876) =

British armoured cruiser

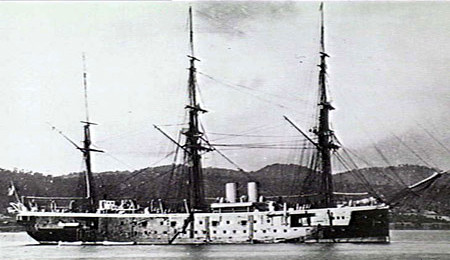
- Nelson in Hobart, 1884

History

United Kingdom
- Name: Nelson
- Namesake: Vice-Admiral Lord Horatio Nelson
- Builder: John Elder & Co.
- Laid down: 2 November 1874
- Launched: 4 November 1876
- Commissioned: 1881
- Reclassified: Training ship, 1902
- Fate: Sold for scrap, 12 July 1910

General characteristics (as built)
- Class & type: Nelson-class armoured cruiser
- Displacement: 7,473 long tons (7,593 t)
- Length: 280 ft (85 m) (p/p)
- Beam: 60 ft (18 m)
- Draught: 23 ft 9 in (7.24 m)
- Propulsion: 2 shafts, 2 compound-expansion steam engines
- Speed: 14 knots (26 km/h; 16 mph)
- Complement: 560
- Armament: 4 × 10 in (254 mm) rifled muzzle-loading guns (RML); 8 × 9 in (229 mm) RML guns; 6 × 20 pdr guns
- Armour: Belt: 6–9 in (152–229 mm)

HMS Nelson was a Nelson-class armoured cruiser built for the Royal Navy in the 1870s. She was sold for scrap in 1910.

== Design and description ==
The Nelson-class ships were designed as enlarged and improved versions of HMS Shannon to counter the threat of enemy armoured ships encountered abroad. The ships had a length between perpendiculars of 280 feet (85.3 m), a beam of 60 feet (18.3 m) and a deep draught of 25 feet 9 inches (7.8 m). Nelson displaced 7,473 long tons (7,593 t), almost 2,000 long tons (2,000 t) more than Shannon. The steel-hulled ships were fitted with a ram and their crew numbered approximately 560 officers and other ranks.

The ship had a pair of three-cylinder, inverted compound steam engines, each driving a single propeller, using steam provided by 10 oval boilers. The engines produced 6,624 indicated horsepower (4,940 kW) and Nelson reached her designed speed of 14 knots (26 km/h; 16 mph) on her sea trials. The Nelson-class ships carried a maximum of 1,150 long tons (1,170 t) of coal which gave them an economical range of 5,000 nautical miles (9,300 km; 5,800 mi) at a speed of 12.5 knots (23.2 km/h; 14.4 mph). They were barque-rigged with three masts.

== Construction and career ==
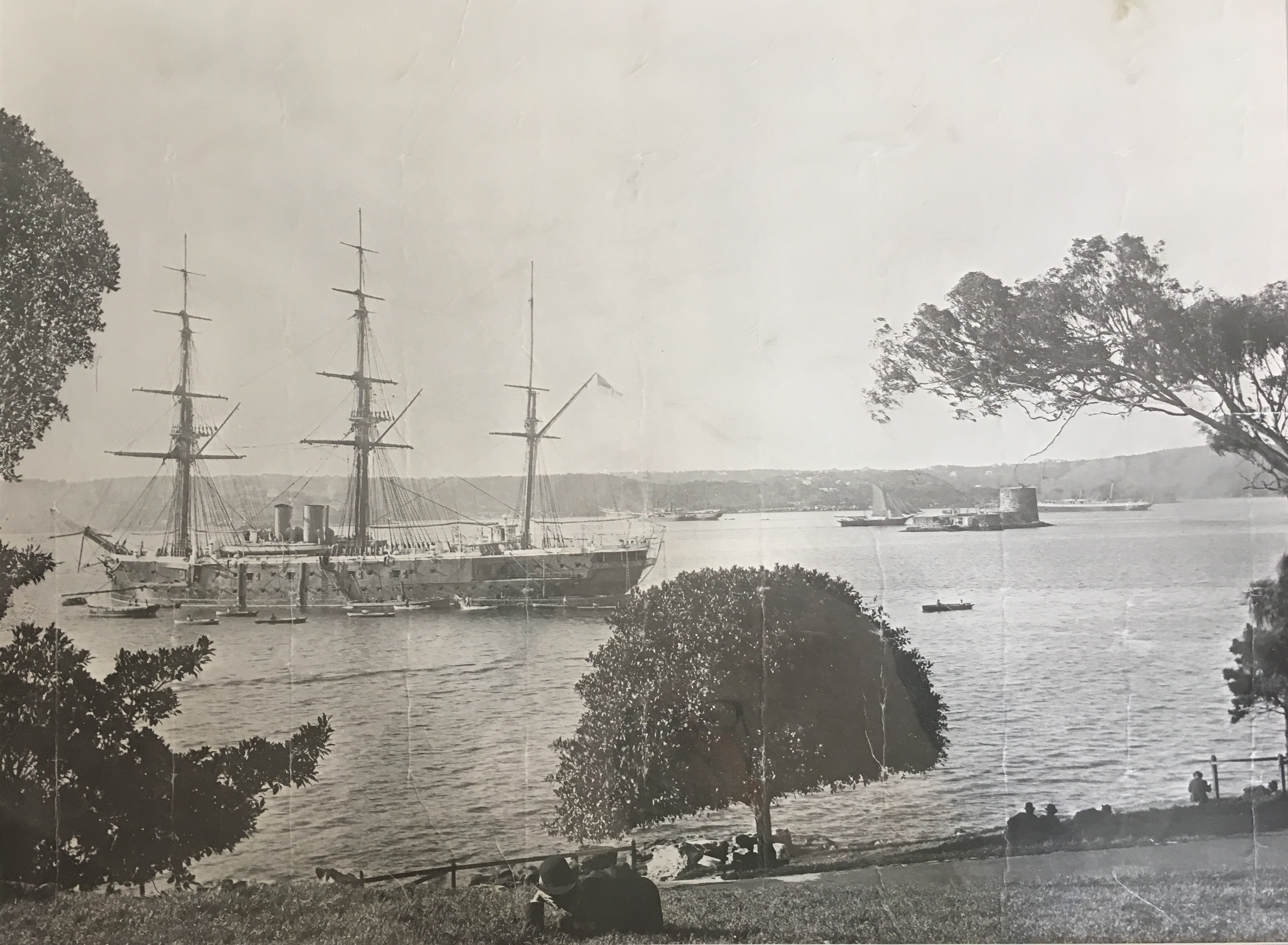
HMS Nelson photographed in Sydney Harbour, with Fort Denison in the background, around 1885

HMS Nelson, named after Vice-Admiral Horatio Nelson, was laid down by John Elder & Co. in Govan, Scotland on 2 November 1874, launched on 4 November 1876, and completed in July 1881. She sailed for the Australia Station after commissioning and became the flagship there in 1885. She remained on station until returning home in January 1889 for a lengthy refit. The ship then became guardship at Portsmouth in October 1891 and was placed in fleet reserve in November 1894. Nelson was degraded to dockyard reserve in April 1901 and hulked seven months later as a training ship for stokers. Commander Harry Stileman was appointed in command on 12 June 1902, and succeeded in February 1903 by Commander Price Vaughan Lewes. She was sold for scrap in July 1910 for £14,500.
