= General-Admiral-class cruiser =

Imperial Russian armored cruisers

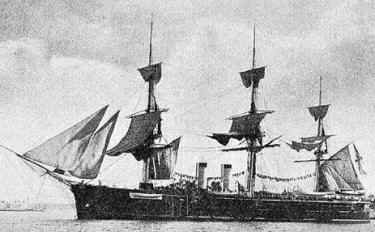
- General-Admiral

Class overview
- Operators: Imperial Russian Navy
- Preceded by: None
- Succeeded by: Minin
- Built: 1870–1877
- In commission: 1875–1938
- Completed: 2
- Scrapped: 2

General characteristics (General-Admiral as completed)
- Type: Armored cruiser
- Displacement: 5,031 long tons (5,112 t)
- Length: 285 ft 10 in (87.1 m)
- Beam: 48 ft (14.6 m)
- Draft: 24 ft 5 in (7.4 m)
- Installed power: 4,772 ihp (3,558 kW); 4 Cylindrical boilers
- Propulsion: 1 Shaft, 1 compound steam engine
- Speed: 12 knots (22 km/h; 14 mph)
- Range: 5,900 nmi (10,900 km; 6,800 mi) at 10 knots (19 km/h; 12 mph)
- Complement: 482 officers and crewmen
- Armament: - as build -; 4 × single 8-inch (203 mm) /22 guns; 2 × single 6-inch (152 mm) /23 guns; 4 × single 1.75-inch (44 mm) Engstrom guns; - since 1881 -; 6 × single 8-inch (203 mm) /22 guns; 2 × single 6-inch (152 mm) /28 guns; - after 1887 -; 6 × single 8-inch (203 mm) /30 guns; 2 × single 6-inch (152 mm) /28 guns; 6 × single 3.4-inch (86 mm) guns; 8 × 5 rev. 37-millimeter (1.5 in) Hotchkiss guns; 2 × 15-inch (381 mm) submerged torpedo tube; - since 1898 (as training ships) -; 4 × single 6-inch (152 mm) /45 Canet guns; 6 × single 47-millimeter (1.9 in) Hotchkiss guns; 2 × 15-inch (381 mm) submerged torpedo tube; - since 1911 (as minelayers) -; 4 × single 75-millimeter (3.0 in) /50 Canet guns
- Armor: Belt: 5–6 in (127–152 mm)

The General-Admiral-class ships were a pair of armored cruisers built for the Imperial Russian Navy in the early 1870s. They are generally considered as the first true armored cruisers.

== Design and description ==
Originally classified as armored corvettes, the General-Admirals were redesignated as semi-armored frigates on 24 March 1875. They were laid out as central battery ironclads with the armament concentrated amidships.

The General-Admiral-class ships were 285 feet 10 inches (87.1 m) long overall. They had a beam of 48 feet (14.6 m) and a draft of 24 feet 5 inches (7.4 m). The ships were designed to displace 4,604 long tons (4,678 t), but displaced 5,031 long tons (5,112 t) as built, an increase of over 400 long tons (410 t). The iron-hulled ships were not fitted with a ram and their crew numbered approximately 482 officers and men.

The ships had a vertical compound steam engine driving a single two-bladed, 20-foot-6-inch (6.25 m) propeller, using steam provided by cylindrical boilers. The number of boilers differed between the sisters. General-Admiral had five that generated a working pressure of 60 psi (414 kPa; 4 kgf/cm^{2}) so that the engine produced 4,772 indicated horsepower (3,558 kW). This gave her during a maximum speed around 12.3 knots (22.8 km/h; 14.2 mph) during her sea trials. Gerzog Edinburgski had four boilers and her engine made 5,590 ihp (4,170 kW) that propelled her at 11.5 knots (21.3 km/h; 13.2 mph).

The General-Admiral class carried a maximum of 1,000 long tons (1,000 t) of coal which gave them an economical range of 5,900 nautical miles (10,900 km; 6,800 mi) at a speed of 10 knots (19 km/h; 12 mph). They were ship-rigged with three masts. To reduce drag while under sail, the single funnel was retractable and the propeller could be hoisted into the hull.

The sisters armament were four 8-inch (203 mm), two 6-inch (152 mm) rifled breech-loading guns (RBL), and four 1.75-inch (44 mm) early masnine-gun likes Engstrom guns.

The ships had a complete waterline belt of wrought iron that ranged in thickness from 6 inches amidships to 5 inches (127 mm) at the ends of the ships. The armor had a total height of 7 feet 1 inch (2.15 m), of which 5 feet 1 inch (1.55 m) was below the waterline. The central battery was also protected by 6-inch armor plates.

== Ships ==
Construction data
Name	Namesake	Builder	Laid down	Launched	Entered service
General-Admiral	Grand Duke Konstantin Nikolayevich of Russia	Nevskiy Works, Saint Petersburg	27 November 1870 (Note: All dates used in this article are New Style)	2 September 1873	1875
Gerzog Edinburgski	Alfred, Duke of Saxe-Coburg and Gotha	Baltic Works, Saint Petersburg	27 September 1870	10 September 1875	1877

== Service ==
General-Admiral had was blown ashore during a heavy storm at Kronstadt in 1875, shortly after being completed. She did not participate in the Russo-Turkish War of 1877–78 and made one cruise in the Pacific in the early 1880s. The ship spent 1884–85 in the Mediterranean before beginning a refit in 1886 during which she was partially re-boilered. General-Admiral had her boilers replaced, her funnel was replaced by two non-retractable funnels, and a fixed propeller was installed in 1892. The ship was reclassified as a 1st-class cruiser on 13 February 1892 and participated the Columibian Naval Review in Hampton Roads, Virginia, the following year. Afterwards she became a training ship. She became a school ship in 1906 and her armament was reduced accordingly.

Gerzog Edinburgski was initially assigned to the Baltic Fleet, but made a lengthy Pacific cruise in 1881–84. She was refitted about 1890 in the same type as her sister's 1892 refit, although her engine and boilers were replaced in 1897. The ship became a training ship for petty officers and was formally reclassified as a school ship like her sister in 1906.

The sisters were converted into minelayers in 1908–11 and renamed after lakes near Saint Petersburg, General-Admiral became Narova and Gerzog Edinburgski was renamed Onega. Their rigging was reduced to pole masts, their armament was reduced to four 75-millimeter (3.0 in) guns, and they could carry 600–800 mines. They both participated in numerous minelaying missions in the early years of World War I, but Onega was hulked in 1915 as Blokshiv No. 9 and became a mine storage ship in Helsinki. Narova, however, continued to lay mines throughout the war. The Treaty of Brest-Litovsk required the Soviets to evacuate their base in March 1918 or have them interned by newly independent Finland, even though the Gulf of Finland was still frozen over. The sisters were not included in the initial group of evacuated ships and were only permitted to leave in May for Kronstadt after lengthy negotiations with the Germans. Narova's crew joined the Soviets and she was used to mine the approaches to Petrograd later that year against the British forces operating in the Gulf of Finland against the Soviets. She was renamed Dvadsatpyatavo Oktyabrya (25 October) in 1922

The ultimate fates of the sisters are not exactly known. Blokshiv No. 9 was apparently broken up in the 1920s while Dvadsatpyatavo Oktyabrya became a mine storage hulk in 1938 before being sunk as a breakwater in the Neva River around 1959.

== Bibliography ==
- Beeler, John Francis (1997). British Naval Policy in the Gladstone-Disraeli Era. San Francisco: Stanford University Press. ISBN 0-8047-2981-6.
- Campbell, N. J. M. (1979). "Russia". In Chesneau, Roger & Kolesnik, Eugene M. (eds.). Conway's All the World's Fighting Ships 1860–1905. New York: Mayflower Books. pp. 170–217. ISBN 0-8317-0302-4.
- Silverstone, Paul H. (1984). Directory of the World's Capital Ships. New York: Hippocrene Books. ISBN 0-88254-979-0.
- Watts, Anthony J. (1990). The Imperial Russian Navy. London: Arms and Armour. ISBN 0-85368-912-1.
- Wright, Christopher C. (1972). "Cruisers of the Imperial Russian Navy, Part I". Warship International. IX (1): 28–52.
