= Russian cruiser Minin =

Russian armoured cruiser

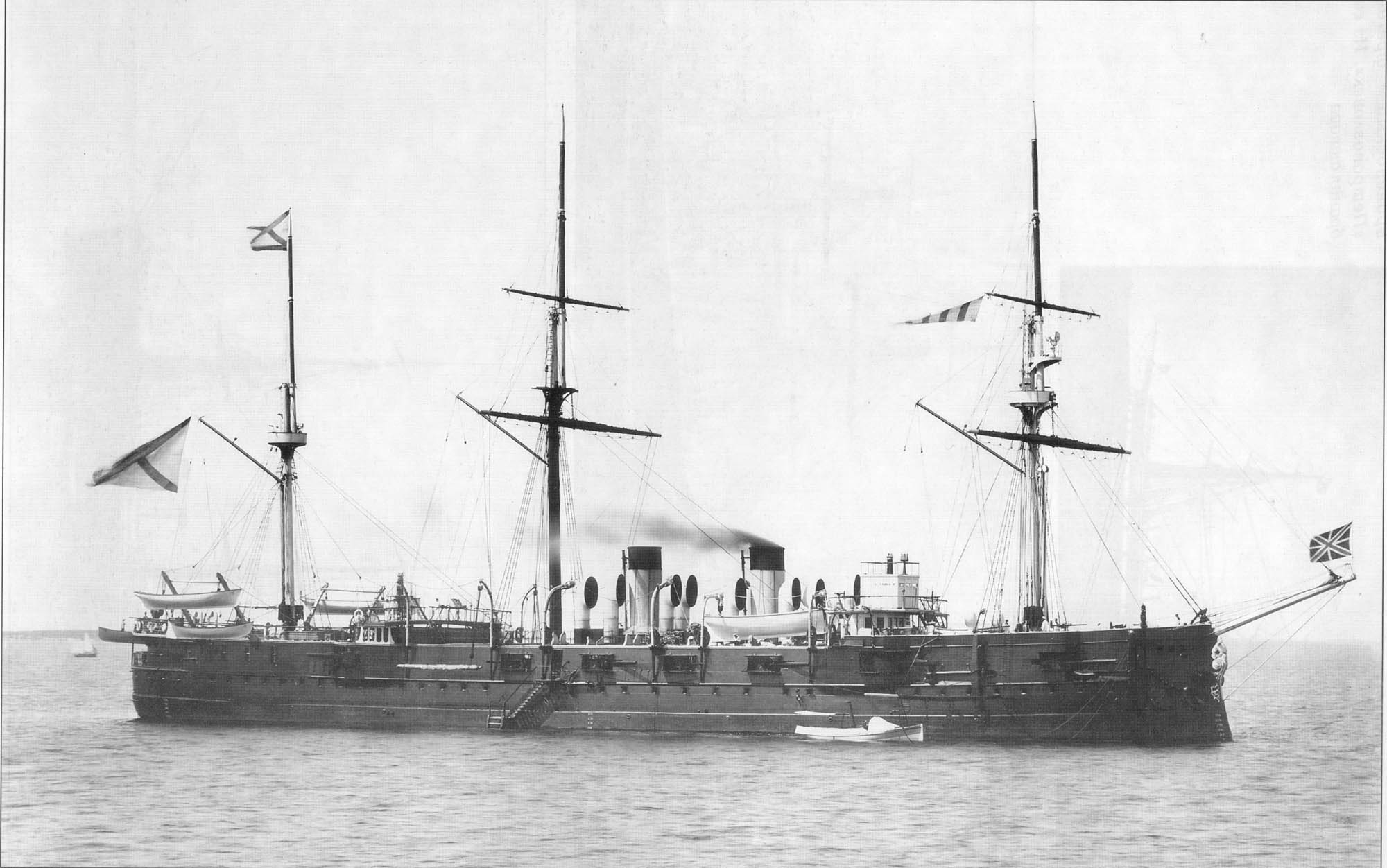
- Minin at anchor after 1887 refit

Class overview
- Name: Minin
- Operators: Imperial Russian Navy
- Preceded by: General-Admiral class
- Succeeded by: Vladimir Monomakh
- Built: 1866–1878
- In commission: 1878–1915
- Completed: 1
- Lost: 1

History

Russian Empire
- Name: Minin (Russian: Минин)
- Namesake: Kuzma Minin
- Builder: Baltic Works, Saint Petersburg
- Laid down: 24 November 1866 (Note: All dates used in this article are New Style)
- Launched: 3 November 1869
- Completed: 1878
- Renamed: Ladoga, October 1909
- Reclassified: Minelayer, 1909
- Fate: Sunk 15 August 1915

General characteristics
- Type: Armored cruiser
- Displacement: 6,136 long tons (6,234 t)
- Length: 295 ft (89.9 m)
- Beam: 49 ft 6 in (15.1 m)
- Draft: 25 ft 5 in (7.7 m)
- Installed power: 5,290 ihp (3,940 kW)
- Propulsion: 1 shaft, 1 Compound steam engine; 12 cylindrical boilers
- Speed: 14 knots (26 km/h; 16 mph)
- Range: 6,000 nautical miles (11,000 km; 6,900 mi)
- Complement: 500 officers and crewmen
- Armament: 4 × single 8-inch (203 mm)/22 guns; 12 × single 6-inch (152 mm)/23 guns; 4 × single 3.4-inch (86.4 mm) guns
- Armor: Belt: 6–7 in (152–178 mm); Deck: 1 in (25 mm)

The Russian cruiser Minin (Russian: Минин) was an armored cruiser built for the Imperial Russian Navy during the 1860s and 1870s. She was renamed Ladoga in 1909 when converted to a minelayer. The ship was sunk in 1915 when she struck a mine laid by a German submarine in the Baltic Sea.

== Design and description ==
Originally designed as a sister ship to the broadside ironclad Kniaz Pozharsky, the navy was dissatisfied with that ship as it believed that foreign developments had made her obsolete. So the ship was redesigned as a low-freeboard twin-turret ship with full rigging, much like the ill-fated British ship HMS Captain. Already launched when Captain capsized in a storm in 1870, Minin was reconstructed as an armored cruiser with her armament on the broadside and improved machinery.

The ship had an overall length of 309 feet 4 inches (94.3 m), a beam of 49 feet 3 inches (15.0 m) and a draft of 23 feet 7 inches (7.2 m). She displaced 6,136 long tons (6,234 t) at deep load. Her hull was sheathed with copper to reduced biofouling and her crew numbered approximately 545 officers and men.

Minin had a vertical compound steam engine that drove a single propeller, using steam provided by a dozen cylindrical boilers. The engine produced 5,290 indicated horsepower (3,940 kW) which gave her a maximum speed around 12.5 knots (23.2 km/h; 14.4 mph). The ship carried a maximum of 1,000 long tons (1,000 t) of coal which gave her an economical range of 4,200 nautical miles (7,800 km; 4,800 mi) at a speed of 9 knots (17 km/h; 10 mph). She was ship-rigged with three masts. To reduce drag while under sail, the single funnel could be lowered.

The ship had four 8-inch (203 mm), a dozen 6-inch (152 mm) and four 87-millimeter (3.4 in) rifled breech-loading guns. She had a complete waterline belt of wrought iron that ranged in thickness from 7 inches (178 mm) amidships to 6 inches at the ends of the ships. The belt had a total height of 7 feet (2.1 m), of which 5 feet (1.5 m) was below the waterline. Minin had a steel deck 1 inch (25 mm) thick at the top of the belt, but her armament was entirely unprotected.

== Construction and career ==
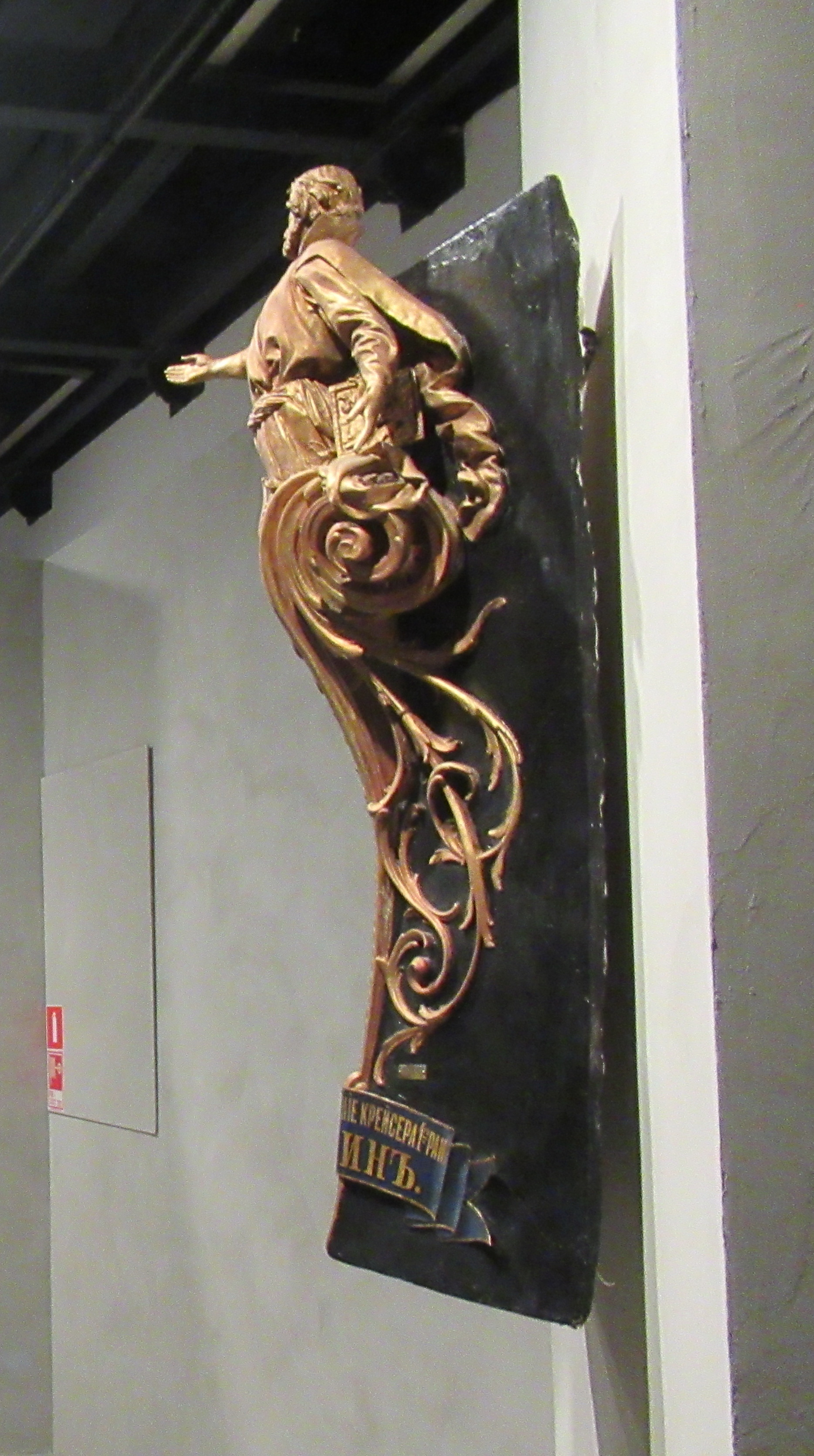

Minin, named after Kuzma Minin, was laid down by Baltic Works in Saint Petersburg on 24 November 1864 as a turret ship armed with four 11-inch (279 mm) gun in two turrets and four 6-inch guns. The ship was launched on 3 November 1869 and began a complete reconstruction the following year. Minin was finally completed in 1878.

In 1885 Minin had a rather unusual docking in the Dutch East Indies. When she required a dry dock, she was not allowed to dock in Singapore, reportedly because her draft was too high. In April she then reached Onrust Island near Batavia, where the Dutch Navy had Onrust Dock of 5,000 tons. This was then occupied by the ironclad Prins Hendrik. As the name implies, this dock would normally not be able to lift Minin. However, the draft of Minin could be lessened to 23.5 feet (7.2 m) by unloading her guns, ammunition, sailing equipment and the like. This would also bring down her weight. In May Minin was indeed unloading, and in June she occupied the dock while Koningin Emma was waiting her turn.

The ship was converted into a minelayer in 1909–11 and renamed Ladoga. Her rigging was reduced to two pole masts, her armament was reduced to four 47-millimeter (1.9 in) guns, and she could carry 1000 mines. Ladoga helped to lay the mine barrier in the Gulf of Finland in 1914 and was sunk in the Baltic on 15 August 1915 by mines laid by SM UC-4.
