= Nelson-class cruiser =

1878 class of British armored cruisers

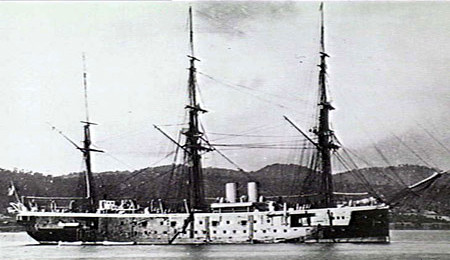
- HMS Nelson anchored in Hobart, 1884

Class overview
- Name: Nelson
- Operators: Royal Navy
- Preceded by: HMS Shannon
- Succeeded by: Imperieuse class
- Built: 1874–1881
- In service: 1878–1910
- In commission: 1878–1904
- Completed: 2
- Scrapped: 2

General characteristics
- Type: Armoured cruiser
- Displacement: 7,473–7,630 long tons (7,593–7,752 t)
- Length: 280 ft (85 m) (p/p)
- Beam: 60 ft (18 m)
- Draught: 25 ft 9 in (7.8 m)
- Propulsion: 2 shafts, 2 compound-expansion steam engines
- Sail plan: Barque-rigged
- Speed: 14 knots (26 km/h; 16 mph)
- Complement: 560
- Armament: 4 × 10-inch (254 mm) rifled, muzzle-loading guns (RML); 8 × 9-inch (229 mm) RML guns; 6 × 20 pdr guns
- Armour: Belt: 6–9 in (152–229 mm)

The Nelson-class cruisers were a pair of armoured cruisers built in the 1870s for the Royal Navy.

== Design and description ==
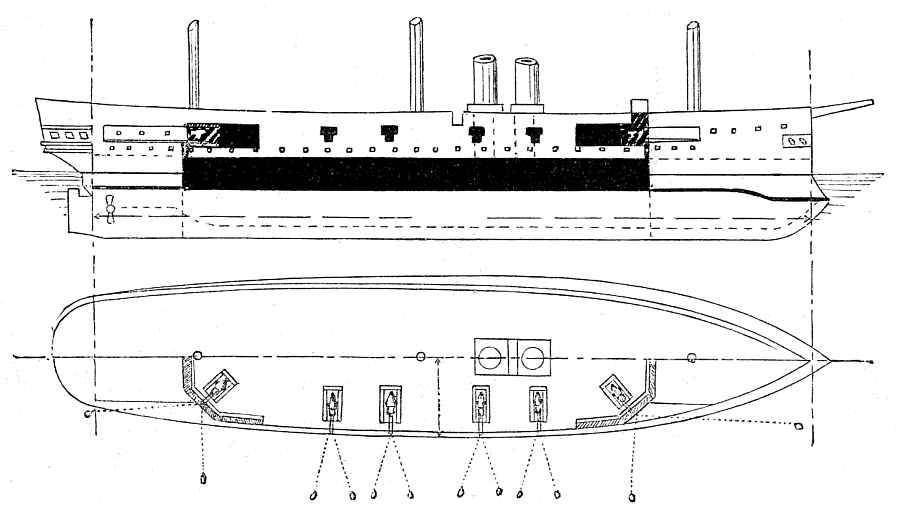
Plan & section of HMS Nelson

The Nelson-class ships were designed by Nathaniel Barnaby, Chief Constructor of the Royal Navy, as enlarged and improved versions of HMS Shannon to counter the threat of enemy armoured ships encountered abroad. The ships were not much liked in service as they were deemed too weakly armoured to fight ironclad battleships and not fast enough to catch commerce-raiding cruisers. They were laid out as central battery ironclads with the armament concentrated amidships.

The Nelsons had a length between perpendiculars of 280 feet (85.3 m), a beam of 60 feet (18.3 m) and a deep draught of 25 feet 9 inches (7.8 m). The ships displaced 7,473–7,630 long tons (7,593–7,752 t), about 2,000 long tons (2,000 t) more than Shannon. The steel-hulled ships were fitted with a ram and their crew numbered approximately 560 officers and other ranks.

The ships had two 3-cylinder, inverted compound steam engines, each driving a single two-bladed, 18-foot (5.5 m) propeller, using steam provided by 10 oval boilers. They generated a working pressure of 60 psi (414 kPa; 4 kgf/cm^{2}) so that the engines produced 6,624 indicated horsepower (4,940 kW) (Nelson) or 6,073 ihp (4,529 kW) (Northampton). The cylinders of the latter's engines could be adjusted in volume to optimize steam production depending on the demand. They were troublesome throughout the ship's life and she was always about 1 knot (1.9 km/h; 1.2 mph) slower than her sister despite repeated efforts to improve her speed. On their sea trials, Nelson reached her designed speed of 14 knots (26 km/h; 16 mph), but Northampton could only reach 13.17 knots (24.39 km/h; 15.16 mph).

== Ships ==
The following table gives the construction details and purchase cost of the Nelson class. Standard British practice at that time was for these costs to exclude armament and stores. In the table:

- Machinery meant "propelling machinery".
- Hull included "hydraulic machinery, gun mountings, etc."

Ship	Builder	Maker of Engines	Date of			Cost according to			
Ship	Builder	Maker of Engines	Laid Down	Launch	Completion	(BNA 1895)			Parkes
Ship	Builder	Maker of Engines	Laid Down	Launch	Completion	Hull	Machinery	Total excluding armament	Parkes
Nelson	Elder & Co., Glasgow	Elder	2 Nov 1874	4 Nov 1876	26 Jul 1880	£303,310	£87,545	£390,865	£411,302
Northampton	Robert Napier and Sons, Glasgow	John Penn and Sons	26 Oct 1874	18 Nov 1876	7 Dec 1878	£296,836	£98,968	£395,804	£414,441

== Service ==
Nelson was assigned to the Australia Station in 1881 and became the flagship there in 1885. She remained on station until returning home in 1889 for a lengthy refit. The ship then became guardship at Portsmouth in October 1891 and was placed in fleet reserve in 1894. Nelson was degraded to dockyard reserve in April 1901 and hulked seven months later as a training ship for stokers. She was sold for scrap in July 1910.

Northampton became flagship of the North America and West Indies Station upon commissioning in 1879 and remained there for the next seven years. Upon her return, she was assigned to the reserve and made annual training cruises until she became a boys' training ship in 1894. The ship was paid off ten years later and sold for scrap in April 1905.
