= Russian cruiser Gerzog Edinburgski =

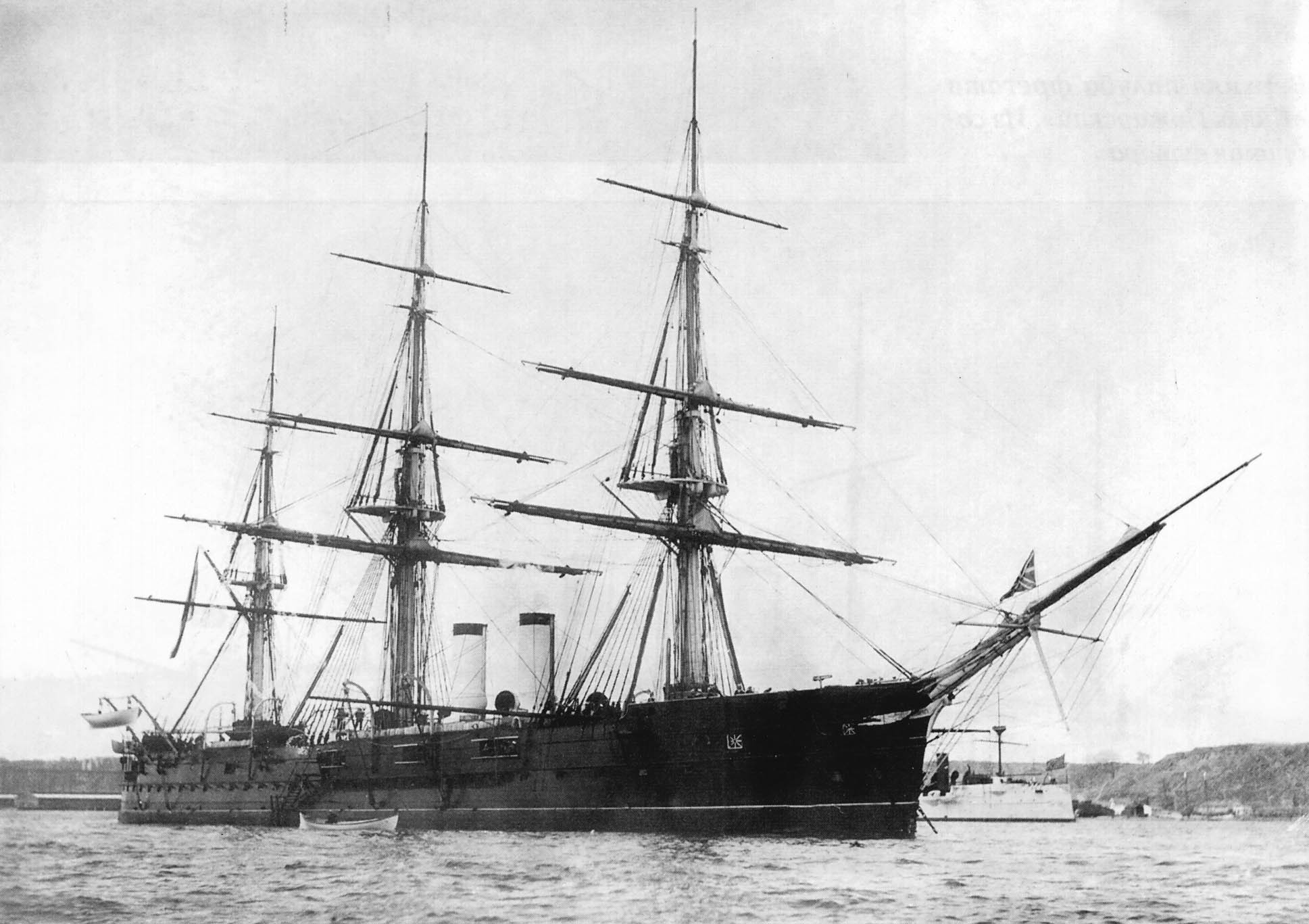
- The Russian armoured cruiser Gerzog Edinburgski

History

Russian Empire
- Name: Gerzog Edinburgski
- Namesake: Prince Alfred, Duke of Edinburgh
- Builder: Baltic Works
- Laid down: 1870
- Launched: 1875
- Commissioned: 1877
- Out of service: 1915
- Renamed: Onega
- Fate: Scrapped in 1949

General characteristics
- Class & type: General-Admiral-class armoured cruiser
- Displacement: 4,600 t (4,500 long tons)
- Length: 87 m (285 ft)
- Beam: 14.6 m (48 ft)
- Draught: 6.45 m (21.2 ft)
- Speed: 12.3 knots (22.8 km/h; 14.2 mph)
- Range: 6,000 nautical miles (11,000 km; 6,900 mi) at 10 knots (19 km/h; 12 mph)
- Armament: - as build -; 4 × single 8-inch (203 mm) /22 guns; 2 × single 6-inch (152 mm) /23 guns; 4 × single 1.75-inch (44 mm) Engstrom guns; - since 1881 -; 6 × single 8-inch (203 mm) /22 guns; 2 × single 6-inch (152 mm) /28 guns; - after 1888 -; 6 × single 8-inch (203 mm) /30 guns; 2 × single 6-inch (152 mm) /28 guns; 6 × single 3.4-inch (86 mm) guns; 8 × 5 rev. 37-millimeter (1.5 in) Hotchkiss guns; 3 × 15-inch (381 mm) submerged torpedo tubes; - since 1898 (as training ship) -; 4 × single 6-inch (152 mm) /45 Canet guns; 6 × single 47-millimeter (1.9 in) Hotchkiss guns; 3 × 15-inch (381 mm) submerged torpedo tubes; - since 1911 (as minelayer) -; 4 × single 75-millimeter (3.0 in) /50 Canet guns
- Armour: Belt: 6 in (150 mm)

Gerzog Edinburgski (Russian: Герцог Эдинбургский) was an armoured cruiser of the General-Admiral class built for the Imperial Russian Navy. She was the sister ship of General-Admiral and was named after Alfred, Duke of Saxe-Coburg and Gotha, Duke of Edinburgh (Gerzog Edinburgski in Russian) who married Grand Duchess Maria Alexandrovna of Russia.

Illustration of units of the International Squadron arriving at Suda Bay, Crete, on 21 December 1898. The French protected cruiser Bugeaud, carrying Prince George of Greece and Denmark, who will take up duty as High Commissioner of the Cretan State, leads the column. She is followed (right to left) by Gerzog Edinburgski, the British battleship HMS Revenge, and the Francesco Morosini.

Gerzog Edinburgski was originally to be named Alexander Nevski but was renamed before launching. She was launched in 1875 and served in the Far East from 1879 to 1884 and in the Mediterranean Sea from 1897 until ca. 1900. While in the Mediterranean, she deployed to Crete to serve in the International Squadron, a multinational force made up of ships of the Austro-Hungarian Navy, French Navy, Imperial German Navy, Italian Royal Navy (Regia Marina), Imperial Russian Navy, and Royal Navy that intervened in the 1897-1898 Greek uprising on Crete against rule by the Ottoman Empire. She took part in the squadron's final operations when, as flagship of the commander of the squadron's Russian forces, Rear Admiral Nikolai Skrydlov, she departed Crete along with the British battleship HMS Revenge (flagship of the commander of British forces in the squadron, Rear-Admiral Gerard Noel) and the Italian battleship Francesco Morosini (flagship of the admiral commanding the squadron's Italian ships) in steaming to Milos with the French protected cruiser Bugeaud, flagship of the International Squadron's overall commander, Rear Admiral Édouard Pottier. At Milos, they rendezvoused with Prince George of Greece and Denmark aboard his yacht. After Prince George boarded Bugeaud on 20 December, Gerzog Edinburgski, Francesco Morosini, and Revenge escorted Bugeaud to Crete, where Prince George disembarked on 21 December 1898 to take office as the High Commissioner of an autonomous Cretan State under the suzerainty of the Ottoman Empire, bringing the Cretan uprising to an end. The International Squadron then dissolved.

Gerzog Edinburgski was used as a training vessel beginning in the early 1900s. She visited Plymouth in September 1902, and was in Brest the following month. She was converted to a second-line minelayer in 1908. The ship could carry 600 mines and was renamed Onega. She was hulked in 1915 as a depot ship and renamed № 4, Barrikada \ «Баррикада», № 9) after the Bolshevik Revolution. She was broken up in 1949.
