= HMS Shannon (1875) =

Cruiser of the Royal Navy

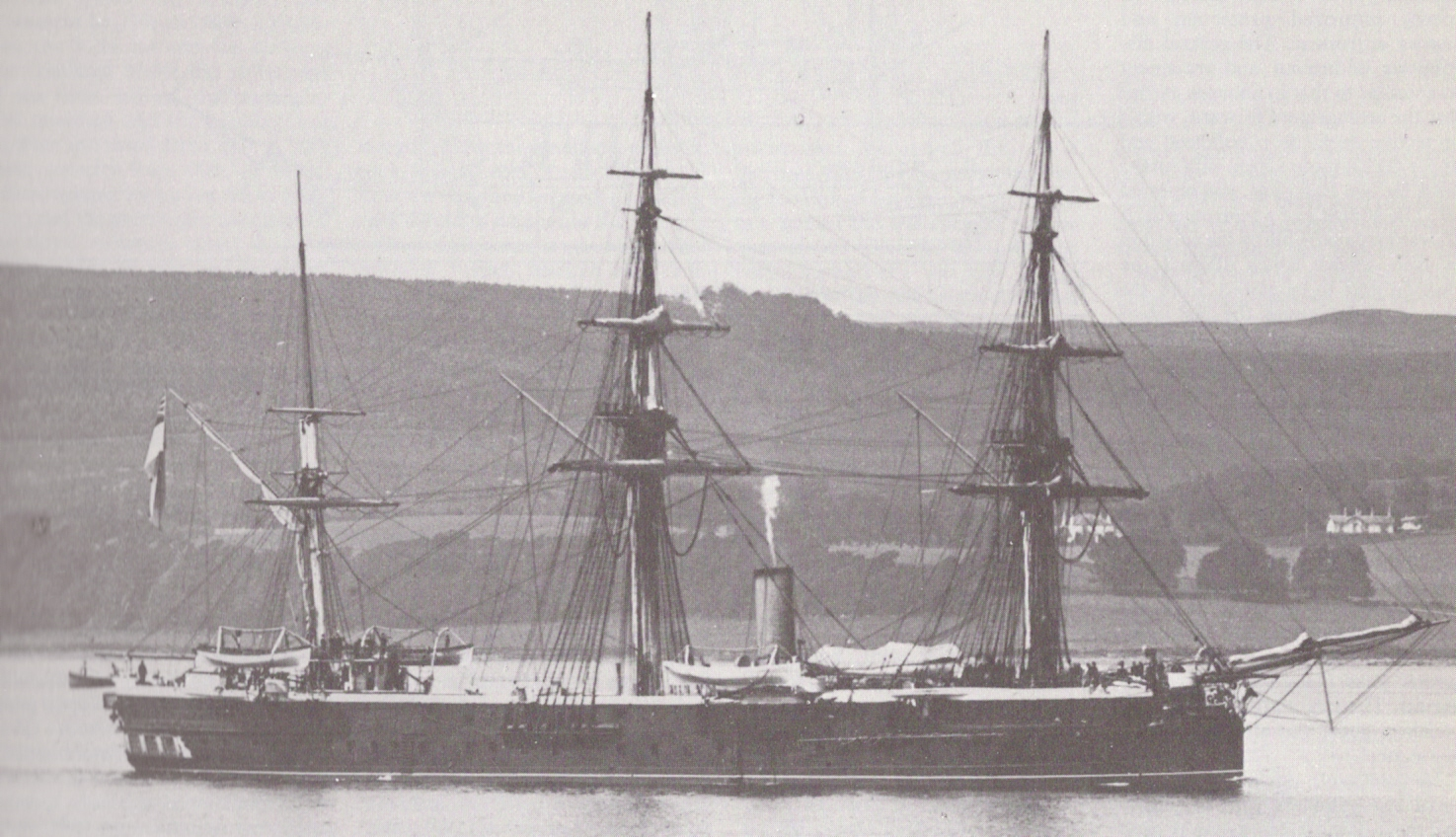
- HMS Shannon as she appeared after her 1881 refit.

History

United Kingdom
- Name: HMS Shannon
- Builder: Pembroke Dockyard
- Laid down: 29 August 1873
- Launched: 11 November 1875
- Commissioned: 17 September 1877
- Fate: Sold for scrapping 12 December 1899

General characteristics
- Displacement: 5,670 tons
- Length: 260 ft (79 m)
- Beam: 54 ft (16.5 m)
- Draught: 22 ft 3 in (6.78 m)
- Propulsion: Sail; As built, with 24,000 ft^{2} (2,200 m^{2}) of sail; reduced shortly afterwards to 21,500 ft^{2} (2,000 m^{2}); Coal fired Laird compound horizontal steam engine; 8 × cylindrical boilers; single screw; 3,370 ihp (2,510 kW)
- Speed: 12.25 knots (22.69 km/h; 14.10 mph) maximum
- Range: Bunker capacity originally 280 tons coal; later increased to 560 tons; sails allowed range only limited by food and water capacity.
- Complement: 452
- Armament: 2 × 10-inch (254 mm) muzzle-loading rifled guns; 7 × 9-inch (229 mm) muzzle-loading rifled guns; From 1881: 6 x 20-pounder (9 kg) breech-loading guns; From 1881: 4 x torpedo tubes
- Armour: Belt: 6 to 9 in (150 to 230 mm) on 10 to 13 in (250 to 330 mm) teak; Deck: 1.5 to 3 in (38 to 76 mm); Bulkheads: 8 to 9 in (200 to 230 mm); Conning tower: 9 in (230 mm)

The eighth HMS Shannon was the first British armoured cruiser. She was the last Royal Navy ironclad to be built which had a propeller that could be hoisted out of the water to reduce drag when she was under sail, and the first to have an armoured deck.

== Design ==
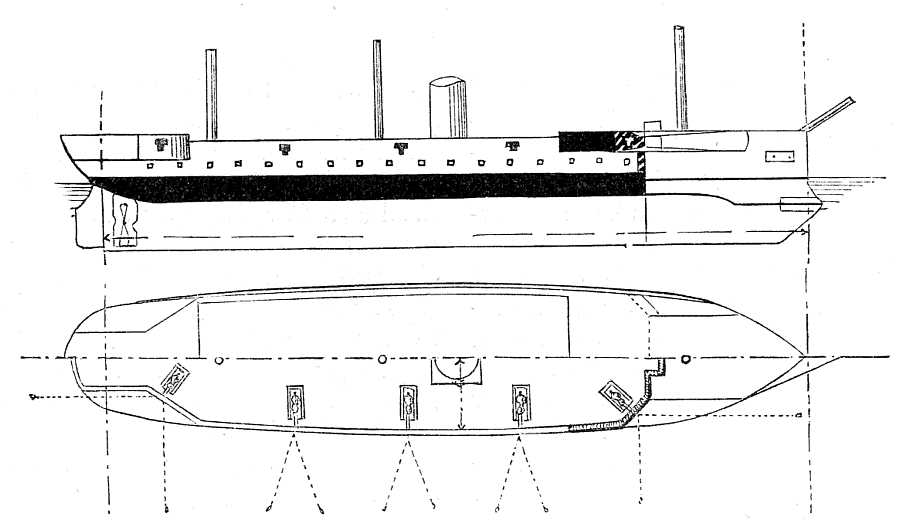
Plan and section of HMS Shannon from Harper's Monthly Magazine, February 1886.

Shannon was built in response to two threats. The instructions of the British Admiralty to the designer, Nathaniel Barnaby, were to design an ironclad "capable of competing with the second class Ironclads of foreign navies". This meant in particular the ten French armoured corvettes of the Alma and La Galissonnière classes, though the ironclads of the smaller navies of Asia, and the Americas also featured. The British counter to these ships were the Audacious and Swiftsure classes of second-class ironclad of the 1860s. Shannon's design was in the lineage of these ships, though the tactical landscape was changing. At the same time as Shannon was being planned, the Imperial Russian Navy launched the first armoured cruisers, General-Admiral and her sister Gerzog Edinburgski. These ships were intended for the traditional cruiser mission of commerce raiding, but were armoured and armed on the same scale as a second-class ironclad. The existence of these ships meant that Shannon was now expected to act as a counter to them, and perform the commerce protection missions which had previously been the preserve of unarmoured cruisers, most recently the Inconstant.

Shannon was armed with two 10-inch guns in armoured embrasures facing towards the bow, six 9-inch guns on the open deck amidships, and a seventh 9-inch gun facing astern. The astern gun could be fired from either of two unarmoured embrasures, one on each side of the ship. She was also equipped with an unusual detachable ram, which was meant to be removed in peacetime to reduce the risk of accidentally ramming another warship. The ram was supposed to be stowed on board and attached in wartime; however this proved to be a very impractical arrangement.

Shannon was armoured in an unconventional manner. An armoured belt 9 feet (2.7 m) tall and between 9 and 6 inches (230 and 150 mm) thick ran for most of the length of the ship, but stopped 60 feet (18 m) from the bow. Above the belt was an armoured deck 1.5 inches (38 mm) thick, the first such armoured deck on a British warship. At the point the belt ended, a 9 in armoured bulkhead ran across the ship, the top of which formed the embrasures for the 10-inch guns on the upper deck. From the bottom of this bulkhead, a 3-inch (76 mm) thick armoured deck extended to the bow, at a level 10 feet (3.0 m) below the waterline. The space above this forward armoured deck was filled with coal bunkers and stores to limit any flooding.

The 9-inch guns were unarmoured (though the armoured bulkhead did protect them against raking fire from ahead) and would have been very exposed in combat. In an action, it was hoped to attempt to ram the enemy while firing with the forward guns and preparing the 9-inch broadside. The crews could then retreat into the armoured part of the ship. If the ramming failed then the guns could be fired electrically as Shannon passed her target.

Shannon could use both sail or steam power. While steam was much preferred for combat, sail propulsion was considered vital for a ship intended to operate worldwide. She was given a lifting screw in order to increase her efficiency under sail, the last Royal Navy warship to be so equipped. She had three masts, and was initially given a ship rig with 24,000 square feet (2,200 m^{2}) of sail, a point insisted on by the Director of Naval Operations, Captain Hood. In service, this was reduced to a barque rig with 21,500 ft^{2} (2,000 m^{2}). She was equipped with Laird two-cylinder compound engines, the high-pressure cylinders being 44 in (110 cm) in diameter and the low-pressure cylinders 85 in (220 cm). Steam came from eight cylindrical boilers at 70 lb (32 kg) pressure. Her design top speed was 13 knots (24 km/h; 15 mph), but her best actual speed was 12.25 knots (22.69 km/h; 14.10 mph). To reduce fouling, she had zinc and wood sheathing on her hull.

== Service ==
Shannon was something of a failure as a warship. While she accomplished more than Swiftsure or Audacious on a more limited displacement, and was the equal of a foreign 'station ironclad', she turned out to be far too slow to be an effective cruiser. While her heavy reliance on sailing efficiency was inevitable given her role, this was incompatible with the speed required to catch a foreign cruiser.

These problems meant that Shannon spent very little time on the overseas stations she was designed for. She was commissioned in July 1877, but she was found to be over-weight and there were problems with her engines, which kept her in dock until March 1878, when she went on a shakedown cruise with the Channel Fleet. In April 1878 she departed for the China Station but was recalled from there in July, and went into dock for further changes. In December 1878 she was commissioned again, serving in Channel and Mediterranean fleets, and was despatched to the Pacific in July 1879, returning in July 1881 when she was refitted. In the Pacific, Shannon was the only ship equipped with 10-inch guns, and no spare ammunition of this calibre was kept at Esquimault; since the expense of moving ammunition to a base that remote was prohibitive, she was prohibited from practicing with her 10-inch guns. This problem could have been addressed by replacing the 10-inch guns in the 1881 refit, but there was little purpose to doing so as Shannon never saw overseas service again.

In May 1883 she briefly became a tender to Warrior and then was relegated to being a coastguard ship. During the Panjdeh Incident in 1885 she was briefly readied for operations. From May 1895 she was in reserve, and she was sold for breaking up in December 1899 for £10,105.

== Building Programme ==
The following table gives the purchase cost of the members of the Shannon. Standard British practice at that time was for these costs to exclude armament and stores. In the table:

- Machinery meant "propelling machinery".
- Hull included "hydraulic machinery, gun mountings, etc."

Cost data
(BNA 1895)			Parkes
Hull	Machinery	Total excluding armament	Parkes
£233,902	£53,367	£287,269	£302,707
