= Russian cruiser General-Admiral =

1873 General-Admiral-class cruiser

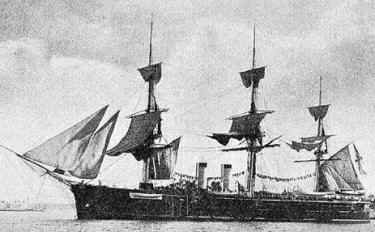
- The Russian armored cruiser General-Admiral

History

Russian Empire
- Name: General-Admiral
- Namesake: Grand Duke Konstantin Nikolayevich of Russia
- Builder: Society of Metal and Mining Works Shipyard
- Laid down: 27 November 1870 (Note: All dates used in this article are New Style)
- Launched: 2 October 1873
- Completed: 1875
- Renamed: Narova, 25 October 1909; 25 Oktiabrya, 1922
- Reclassified: Training ship, 24 March 1906; Minelayer, 1909
- Fate: Scrapped 1953

General characteristics
- Class & type: General-Admiral-class armored cruiser
- Displacement: 5,031 long tons (5,112 t)
- Length: 285 ft 10 in (87.1 m)
- Beam: 48 ft (14.6 m)
- Draft: 24 ft 5 in (7.4 m)
- Installed power: 4,772 ihp (3,558 kW)
- Propulsion: 1 shaft, 1 Vertical compound steam engine; 5 cylindrical boilers
- Speed: 12 knots (22 km/h; 14 mph)
- Range: 5,900 nmi (10,900 km; 6,800 mi) at 10 knots (19 km/h; 12 mph)
- Complement: 482 officers and crewmen
- Armament: - as build -; 4 × single 8-inch (203 mm) /22 guns; 2 × single 6-inch (152 mm) /23 guns; 4 × single 1.75-inch (44 mm) Engstrom guns; - since 1881 -; 6 × single 8-inch (203 mm) /22 guns; 2 × single 6-inch (152 mm) /28 guns; - after 1887 -; 6 × single 8-inch (203 mm) /30 guns; 2 × single 6-inch (152 mm) /28 guns; 6 × single 3.4-inch (86 mm) guns; 8 × 5 rev. 37-millimeter (1.5 in) Hotchkiss guns; 2 × 15-inch (381 mm) submerged torpedo tubes; - since 1898 (as training ship) -; 4 × single 6-inch (152 mm) /45 Canet guns; 6 × single 47-millimeter (1.9 in) Hotchkiss guns; 2 × 15-inch (381 mm) submerged torpedo tubes; - since 1911 (as minelayer) -; 4 × single 75-millimeter (3.0 in) /50 Canet guns
- Armor: Belt: 6 in (152 mm); Battery: 6 in (152 mm); Deck: .5 in (12.7 mm)

General-Admiral was the lead ship of her class of armored cruisers built for the Imperial Russian Navy in the early 1870s. She is generally considered the first true armored cruiser.

== Design and description ==
Originally classified as an armored corvette, General-Admiral was redesignated as a semi-armored frigate on 24 March 1875. She was laid out as a central battery ironclad with the armament concentrated amidships. The iron-hulled ship was not fitted with a ram and her crew numbered approximately 482 officers and men.

General-Admiral was 285 feet 10 inches (87.1 m) long overall. She had a beam of 48 feet (14.6 m) and a draft of 24 feet 5 inches (7.4 m). The ship was designed to displace 4,604 long tons (4,678 t), but displaced 5,031 long tons (5,112 t) as built, an increase of over 400 long tons (410 t).

=== Propulsion ===
The ship had a vertical compound steam engine driving a single two-bladed 6.25-meter (20 ft 6 in) propeller. Steam was provided by five cylindrical boilers at a pressure of 4.24 kg/cm^{2} (416 kPa; 60 psi). The engine produced 4,772 indicated horsepower (3,558 kW) during sea trials which gave the ship a maximum speed around 12.3 knots (22.8 km/h; 14.2 mph). General-Admiral carried a maximum of 1,000 long tons (1,000 t) of coal which gave her an economical range of 5,900 nautical miles (10,900 km; 6,800 mi) at a speed of 10 knots (19 km/h; 12 mph). She was ship-rigged with three masts. To reduce drag while under sail her funnel was retractable and her propeller could be hoisted into the hull.

== See also ==
- List of Russian inventions
