= Armored cruiser =

Type of cruiser in the late 19th and early 20th centuries

The Russian armored cruiser Rurik.

The armored cruiser was a type of warship of the late 19th and early 20th centuries. It was designed like other types of cruisers to operate as a long-range, independent warship, capable of defeating any ship apart from a pre-dreadnought battleship and fast enough to outrun any battleship it encountered.

For many decades, naval technology had not advanced far enough for designers to produce a cruiser that combined an armored belt with the long-range and high speed required to fulfil its mission. For this reason, beginning in the 1880s and 1890s, many navies preferred to build protected cruisers, which only relied on a lightly armored deck to protect the vital parts of the ship. By the late 1880s, the development of modern rapid-fire breech-loading guns and high-explosive shells made the reintroduction of side armor a necessity. The invention of case-hardened armor in the mid-1890s offered effective protection with less weight than previously.

Varying in size, the armored cruiser was distinguished from other types of cruiser by its belt armor—thick iron (or later steel) plating on much of the hull to protect the ship from shellfire much like that on battleships. The first armored cruiser, General-Admiral of the Imperial Russian Navy was launched in 1873 and combined sail and steam propulsion. By the 1890s, cruisers had abandoned sail and took on a modern appearance.

In 1908, the armored cruiser was supplanted by the battlecruiser, which, with armament equivalent to that of a dreadnought battleship and speed equivalent to that of a cruiser, was faster and more powerful than an armored cruiser. At around the same time there was a successor to the protected cruiser, the "light cruiser" which described small cruisers with armored belts. Although they were now considered second-rate ships, armored cruisers were still much used in World War I due to their speed and range, and being able to outgun all but battlecruisers and battleships (both pre-dreadnought and dreadnought types). Most surviving armored cruisers were scrapped after the war under the terms of the Washington Naval Treaty of 1922, which imposed limits on warships and defined a cruiser as a ship of 10,000 tons or less carrying guns of 8-inch caliber or less—rather smaller than many of the large armored cruisers. A handful survived in one form or another until World War II. Only one, the Georgios Averof of the Greek Navy survives as a museum ship.

== History ==
=== Background ===
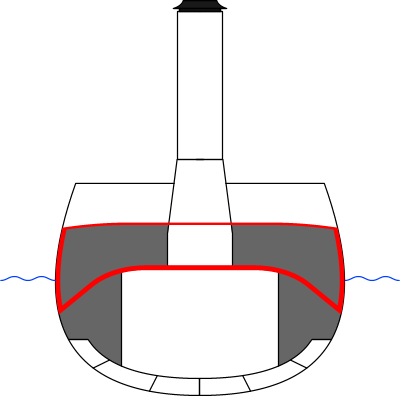
Schematic of an armored cruiser. Red lines: armored upper and middle decks and side belt. Grey areas: lateral protective coal bunkers. The machinery was arranged in the protected internal void above the double-bottom.

The armored cruiser was developed in the 1870s as an attempt to combine the virtues of the armored ironclad warship and the fast and long-ranged, but unarmored, cruisers of the time. Such a ship was desirable to protect overseas trade and, especially for the French and British, to police their vast overseas empires. The concern within higher naval circles was that without ships that could fulfill these requirements and incorporate new technology, their fleet would become obsolete and ineffective should a war at sea arise. Concern over obsolescence in official circles was further fueled by the race between the increasing size of naval guns and of armor strong enough to withstand such fire. In 1860, one of the largest naval cannons in standard use had a bore of 8 inches (203 mm) and fired a 68-pound (31 kg) solid shot or approximately 51-pound (23 kg) spherical shell. By 1884, guns with as wide a bore as 16.25 inches (413 mm), firing an 1,800-pound (816 kg) exploding shell, were being mounted on naval vessels. This gun could penetrate up to 34 inches of wrought iron, the earliest form of naval armor. These were muzzle-loading guns, as had been used on ships from the 1500s. Breech-loading cannon, which were readopted into naval use in the 1870s, were more destructive than muzzle loaders due to their higher rate of fire. The development of rifled cannon, which improved accuracy, and advancements in shells were other factors. Although a cruiser would not likely face the largest-caliber guns of a battleship and many navies commonly used smaller weapons as they did not wear out as fast as larger ones did, cruisers still needed some form of protection to preclude being shot to pieces.

The adoption of rolled iron armor in 1865 and sandwich armor in 1870 gave ships a chance to withstand fire from larger guns. Both these protective schemes used wood as an important component, which made them extremely heavy and limited speed, the key factor in a cruiser's ability to perform its duties satisfactorily. While the first ocean-going ironclads had been launched around 1860, the "station ironclads" built for long-range colonial service such as the British Audacious class and French Belliqueuse were too slow, at 13 and 11 knots respectively, to raid enemy commerce or hunt down enemy commerce raiders, tasks usually assigned to frigates or corvettes. Powered by both sail and steam but without the additional weight of armor, these ships could reach speeds of up to 16 or 17 knots. The most powerful among them were the British Inconstant, the U.S. Navy's Wampanoag and the French Duquesne. The British especially had hoped to rely on these vessels to serve the more distant reaches of its empire. In the aftermath of the Battle of Hampton Roads in 1862, where United States wooden warships were defeated by the Confederate ironclad CSS Virginia, the Admiralty realized that its ships could theoretically encounter an ironclad in any theater of operation.

Ship propulsion was improving but was also taking time to develop. Naval engines in the 1860s were single-expansion types, in which steam was expanded into a cylinder, pushed a piston and was released. Compounding, where steam is passed through a series of cylinders of increasing size before being released, was a more efficient process; it allowed the steam to generate more energy and use less coal to go the same distance. With greater efficiency came increasingly complex machinery and the larger potential for breakdown. However, advances in metallurgy and engineering, the potential for smaller bunkerage and the successful use of compounding in commercial engines made it an attractive option for naval engines, as well. By the 1870s, compound engines had become standard for warships. Compounding by itself did not increase power or speed significantly, although it allowed for a much greater operating range. Forced-draught systems would help increase power and speed but would not come into use until the early 1890s.

=== 1870s: First armored cruisers ===
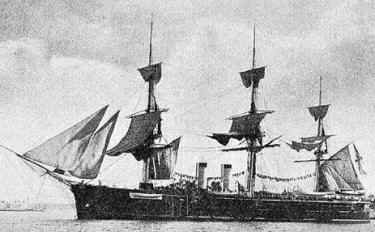
Russian armored cruiser General-Admiral.

The Russian navy became the first to produce an armored warship intended for commerce raiding, with General-Admiral, begun in 1870 and launched in 1873, often referred to as the first armored cruiser. Armed with six 8-inch (203 mm) and two 6-inch (152 mm) guns, she and her sister Gerzog Edinburgski were not fully armored but protected only by a narrow belt along the waterline. This belt, moreover, was so heavy that it sat below the ships' waterlines, which limited its benefit still further. Since they were iron-hulled, however, they were more durable than their wooden counterparts. With a top speed of only 12.3 knots (22.8 km/h) and a high coal consumption, which necessitated a full sailing rig, they were not really suited for the role of cruiser. Nevertheless, these ships were considered a new threat to British commerce in the event of war, the rationale being that any vessel, regardless of its speed, could technically be a threat to overseas commerce.

The British responded with Shannon, begun in 1873, launched in 1875 and armed with two 10-inch (254 mm) and seven 9-inch (229 mm) rifled guns. Two ships of the Nelson class followed, armed with four 10-inch and eight 9-inch guns. These early armored cruisers were essentially scaled-down versions of the first-rate ironclad warships of the time and, like their Russian counterparts, were essentially belted cruisers. Their 9-inch belts were thicker than that of the Russians but did not extend the full length of the hull due to weight but tapered off at both ends. Past this belt, the designers placed a 3-inch (76 mm) armored deck, situated deepest in the ships, to guard magazines and machinery against plunging fire. Above this deck, space was allocated for coal bunkers and storerooms. These areas served a two-fold purpose. The bunkers served as added protection, since two feet of coal was considered the equivalent of one foot of steel. Also, if either of the ships became flooded from battle damage, it was hoped the contents of the bunkers and storerooms would aid in their continued buoyancy. Because of this unarmored protection, these ships could be considered the first protected cruisers. However, these ships also shared the liabilities of the Russian ones and because of this, the British Navy was never happy with them. Shannon's top speed of 12.25 knots (22.69 km/h) and Nelson's of 14 knots (26 km/h) made them too slow to deal with fast cruisers and they were not armored well enough to take on a first-class battleship. Their armor belts also sat below the ships' waterlines, which made them of limited benefit.

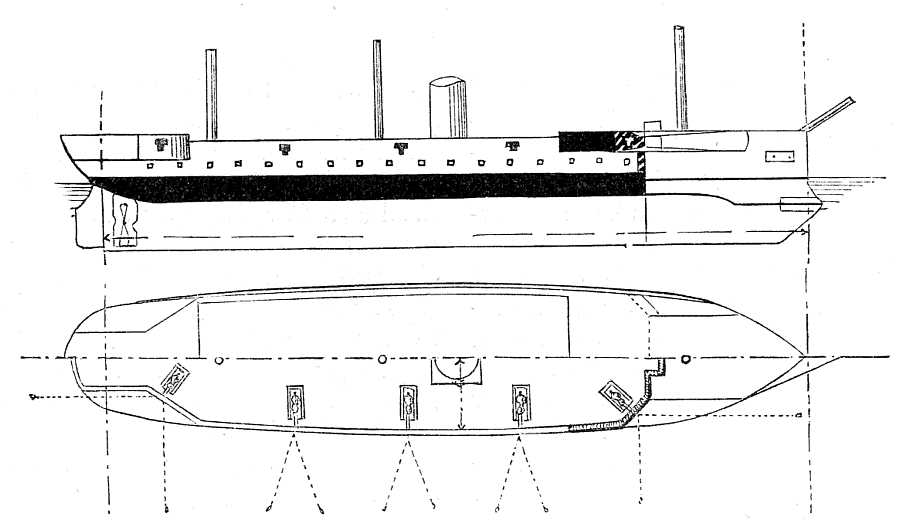
Plan and section of HMS Shannon from Harper's Monthly Magazine, February 1886.

The underlying problem with these early warships was that technology had not caught up to the demands being made of them; therefore, they represented a series of compromises and could not be fully effective. They were typically powered by double-expansion steam engines fed by boilers which generated steam at perhaps 60 or 70 psi pressure, which gave relatively poor efficiency and short range. Even with improved engines, the dearth of overseas refueling stations made a full sailing rig a necessity. As sailing ships required a high freeboard and a large degree of stability, the use of armored turrets as used on monitors and some battleships was ruled out, because a turret was a very heavy weight high in the ship and its placement necessitated a lower freeboard than was warranted for an oceangoing vessel. (The loss of HMS Captain in 1870 with nearly all of her 500-man crew illustrated graphically what could happen in a heavy sea with a steam-and-sail turret ship.) Consequently, armored cruisers retained a more traditional broadside arrangement. Their armor was distributed in a thick belt around the waterline along most of their length; the gun positions on deck were not necessarily armored at all. The limitations of these ships would not be rectified fully until decades after their construction.

Meanwhile, a battle in May 1877 between the British unarmored cruiser Shah and the Peruvian monitor Huáscar demonstrated the need for more and better-protected cruisers. Shah and the smaller wooden corvette Amethyst hit Huáscar more than 50 times without causing significant damage. The Peruvian ship had an inexperienced crew unused to its cumbersome machinery, and managed to fire only six rounds, all of which missed. The engagement demonstrated the value of cruisers with armor protection.

=== Rise of the protected cruiser in the 1880s ===
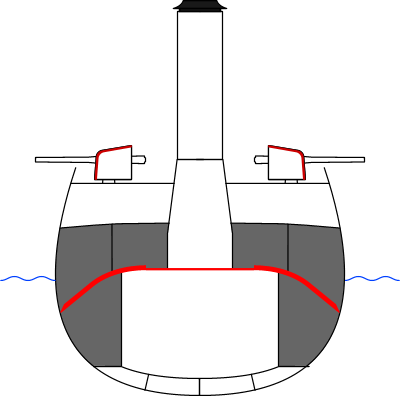
Schematic of a protected cruiser. Red lines: armored deck and gun shield. Grey areas: protective coal bunkers.

During the 1870s, the rapid increase in the size and power of armor-piercing guns caused problems for the designers of battleships and cruisers alike. Even a ship designed with adequate armor protection from the current generation of guns might be vulnerable to new guns powerful enough to penetrate its armor. Consequently, naval designers tried a novel method of armoring their ships. The vital parts—engines, boilers, magazines and enough hull structure to keep the ship stable in the event of damage—could be positioned underneath an armored deck just below the waterline. This deck, which would only be struck very obliquely by shells, could be thinner and lighter than belt armor. The sides of the ship would be entirely unarmored but would be as effective as an armored belt which would not stop shellfire. Cruisers designed along these guidelines, known as protected cruisers, superseded armored cruisers in the 1880s and early 1890s.

As mentioned earlier, the armored cruiser Shannon was the first ship to make use of an armored deck. However, by the end of the 1870s, ships could be found with full–length armored decks and little or no side armor. The Italian Italia class of very fast battleships had armored decks and guns but no side armor. The British used a full-length armored deck in their Comus class of corvettes started in 1878; however the Comus class were designed for colonial service and were only capable of 13 knots (24 km/h) speed, not fast enough for commerce protection or fleet duties.

The breakthrough for the protected cruiser design came with the Chilean Esmeralda, designed and built by the British firm Armstrong at their Elswick yard. Esmeralda, with a high speed of 18 knots (33 km/h), dispensed entirely with sails and carried an armament of two 10-inch and six 6-inch guns, considered very powerful for a ship her size. Her protection scheme, inspired by the Italia class, included a full–length protected deck up to 2 inches (51 mm) thick, and a cork-filled cofferdam along her sides. Esmeralda set the tone for cruiser construction for the years to come, with "Elswick cruisers" on a similar design being constructed for Italy, China, Japan, Argentina, Austria and the United States. Protected cruisers became attractive for two reasons. First, the concept of the armored cruiser was not embraced wholeheartedly in naval circles. Second, several navies were caught in a race between armor thickness and the size of main guns and did not have the money to spend on battleships and armored cruisers. The use of smaller, cheaper cruisers was a better alternative.

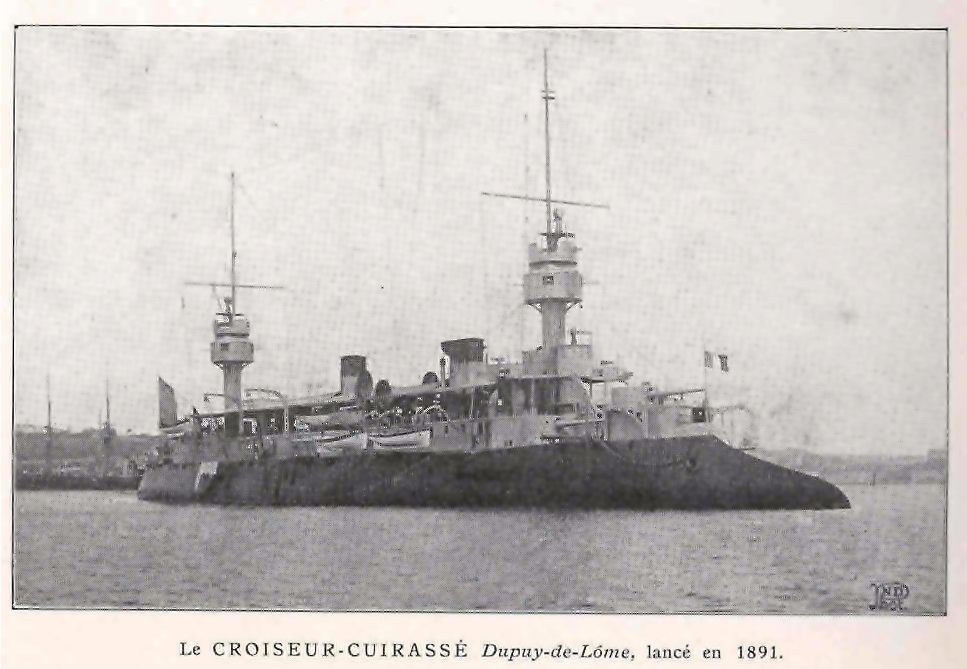
French armored cruiser Dupuy de Lôme

The French navy adopted the protected cruiser wholeheartedly in the 1880s. The Jeune Ecole school of thought, which proposed a navy composed of fast cruisers for commerce raiding and torpedo-boats for coast defense, was particularly influential in France. The first French protected cruiser was Sfax, laid down in 1882, and followed by six classes of protected cruiser – and no armored cruisers until Dupuy de Lôme, laid down in 1888 but not finished until 1895. Dupuy de Lôme was a revolutionary ship, being the first French armored cruiser to dispose entirely of masts, and sheathed in steel armor. However, she and two others were not sufficiently seaworthy, and their armor could be penetrated by modern quick-firing guns. Thus from 1891 to 1897 the French reverted to the construction of protected cruisers.

The British Royal Navy was equivocal about which protection scheme to use until 1887. The large Imperieuse class, begun in 1881 and finished in 1886, were built as armored cruisers but were often referred to as protected cruisers. While they carried an armored belt some 10 in thick, the belt only covered 140 ft (43 m) of the 315 ft (96 m) length of the ship, and was submerged below the waterline at full load. The real protection of the class came from the armored deck 4 in (102 mm) thick, and the arrangement of coal bunkers to prevent flooding. These ships were also the last armored cruisers to be designed with sails. However, on trials it became clear that the masts and sails did more harm than good; they were removed and replaced by a single military mast with machine guns.

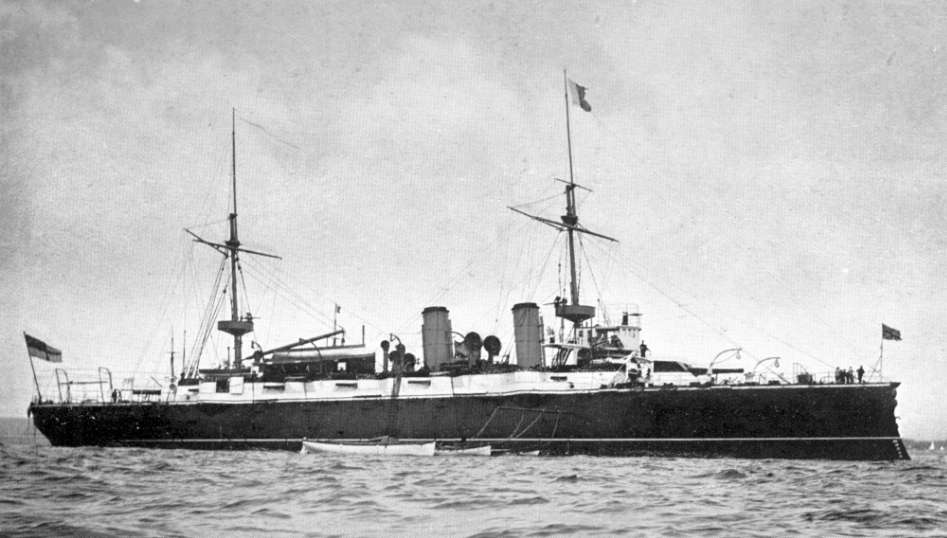
HMS Orlando

The next class of small cruisers in the Royal Navy, the Mersey class, were protected cruisers, but the Royal Navy then returned to the armored cruiser with the Orlando class, begun in 1885 and completed in 1889. The navy judged the Orlandos inferior to protected cruisers and built exclusively protected cruisers immediately afterwards, including some very large, fast ships like the 14,000-ton Powerful class. However, the Orlandos were the first class of cruiser to use the triple-expansion engine. Because this type of reciprocating engine used the steam in three stages, it was more fuel-efficient than earlier compound engines. It also used steam of higher pressure, 60 poundforce per square inch, as compared to the 25 to 30 poundforce in earlier engines. With these engineering developments, warships could now dispense with sails and be entirely steam-driven.

The only major naval power to retain a preference for armored cruisers during the 1880s was Russia. The Russian Navy laid down four armored cruisers and one protected cruiser during the decade, all being large ships with sails.

=== Armored cruisers in the pre-dreadnought era ===
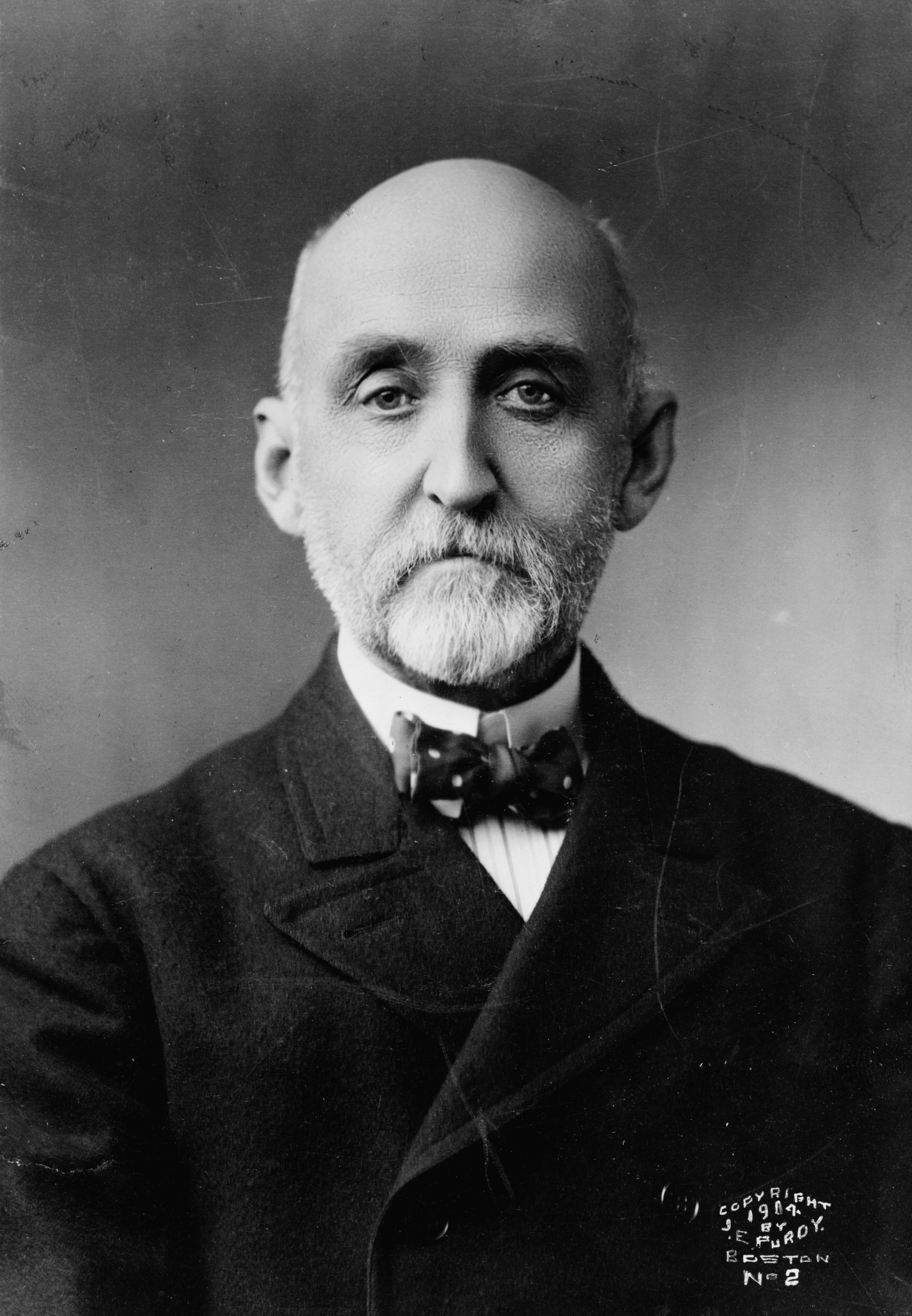
Alfred Thayer Mahan, whose book The Influence of Sea Power upon History triggered a resurgence of the armored cruiser.

The development of rapid–fire cannons in the late 1880s forced a change in cruiser design. Since a large number of hits at or near the waterline could negate the effect of water–excluding material used in protected cruisers, side armor again became a priority. Four inches (c. 10 cm) was considered adequate. However, it had to cover not just guns and the waterline but also much of the hull structure in–between; otherwise, the equally new high–explosive shells could penetrate and destroy much of the unarmored portion of the ship. Another development was the publication in 1890 of American naval strategist Alfred Thayer Mahan's book The Influence of Sea Power upon History. While Mahan emphasized the importance of battleships above all other types of warships in obtaining command of the sea, armored cruisers and large protected cruisers could still be used as second-class battleships to maintain control of the sea lanes and potentially as fighting units of a battle fleet.

The armored cruisers built in the mid– to late–1890s were often as large and expensive as pre-dreadnought battleships. They combined long range, high speed and an armament approaching that of battleship with enough armor to protect them against quick-firing guns, considered the most important weapons afloat at the time. Their speed was made possible due to another development, case-hardened steel armor—first Harvey armor and then crucially Krupp armor. The higher tensile strength of these armors compared to nickel steel and mild steel made it feasible to put a light yet useful armor belt on a large cruiser. They saved further weight by not requiring a heavy timber backing, as previous armor plating had, to soften and spread the force of the impact from oncoming shells; 2.5 inches (64 mm) of teak to give a fair surface upon which to attach them was all that was needed. Moreover, this belt could also be much wider than previously, covering the center of the hull, where the ammunition and engines were located, from the main deck to five feet below the waterline. Steel bulkheads added strength to the hull, while armor as thick as the belt covered the guns and heavier protection surrounded the conning tower. With these improvements, the ships became more fully protected than was possible previously. They were also expensive to maintain at fighting strength as they required a greater number of stokers to feed the boilers than a battleship when steaming at flank speed.

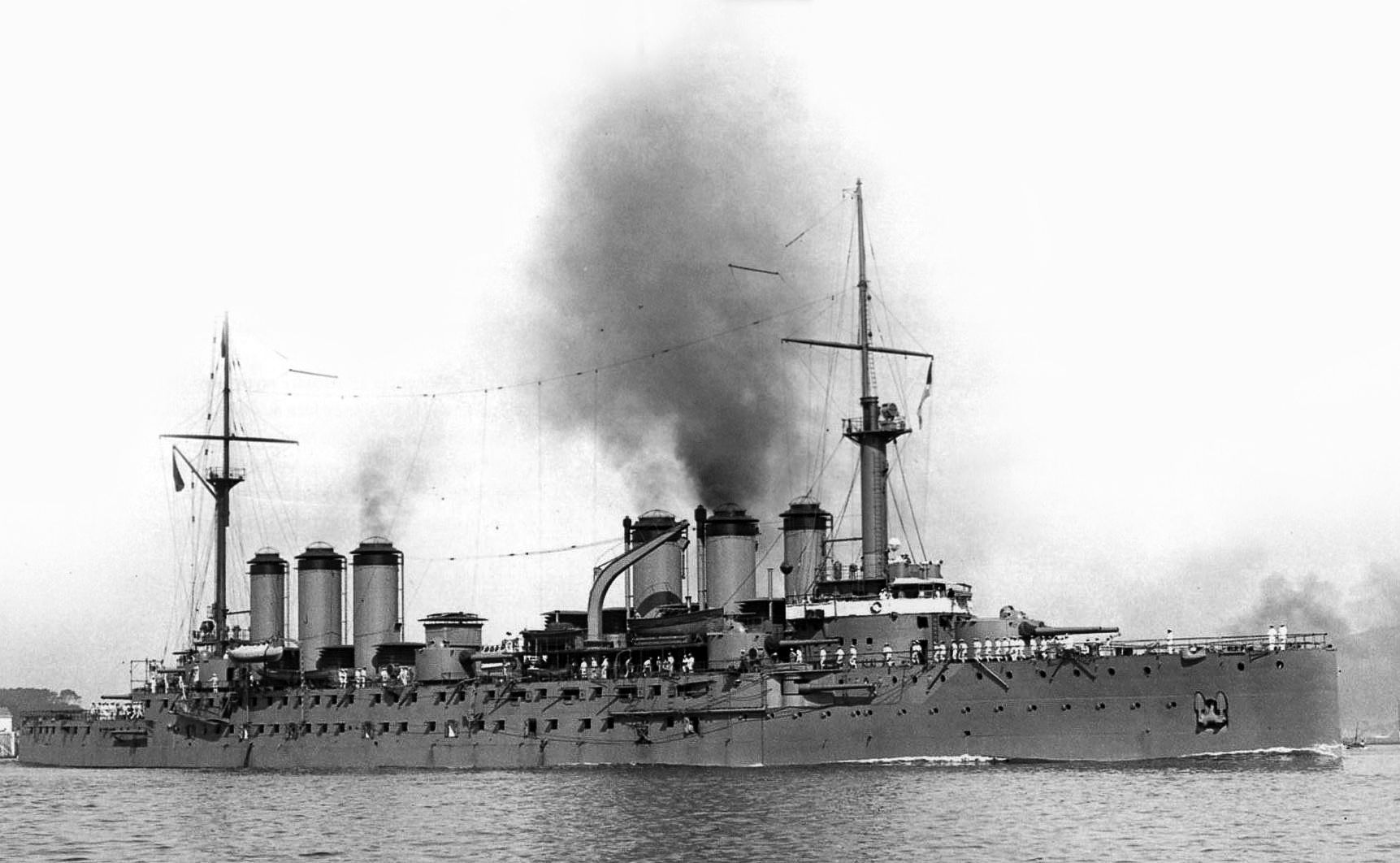
Edgar Quinet in 1911

The ideas presented by Mahan prompted French Admiral Ernest François Fournier to write his book La flotte necessaire in 1896. Fournier argued that a fleet of technologically advanced armored cruisers and torpedo craft would be powerful and flexible enough to engage in a wide range of activity and overwhelm potential enemies. French naval and government circles embraced this ideal mutually and even advocates of battleships over cruisers admitted the latter's potential usefulness in scouting and commercial warfare. The result was the building of increasingly large armored cruisers. Jeanne d'Arc, laid down in 1896, displaced 11,000 tons, carried a mixed armament of 194-millimetre (7.6 in) and 138-millimetre (5.4 in) guns, and had a 150-millimetre (5.9 in) belt of Harvey armor over her machinery spaces. The 12,300-ton Léon Gambetta class and 14,000-ton Edgar Quinet class followed. With a speed of 22.5 knots, the Léon Gambettas were armed with four 194-millimetre (7.6 in) guns in twin turrets and 16 164-millimetre (6.5 in) in four single and six twin turrets and were protected by up to 150-millimetre (5.9 in) of Krupp belt armor and nearly 200-millimetre (7.9 in) on their conning towers and turrets. The Edgar Quinets, slightly faster at 23 knots, were armed with 14 194-millimetre (7.6 in) guns and carried up to 170-millimetre (6.7 in) of armor on their belts, almost 100-millimetre (3.9 in) on their decks and 150-millimetre (5.9 in) on their turrets.

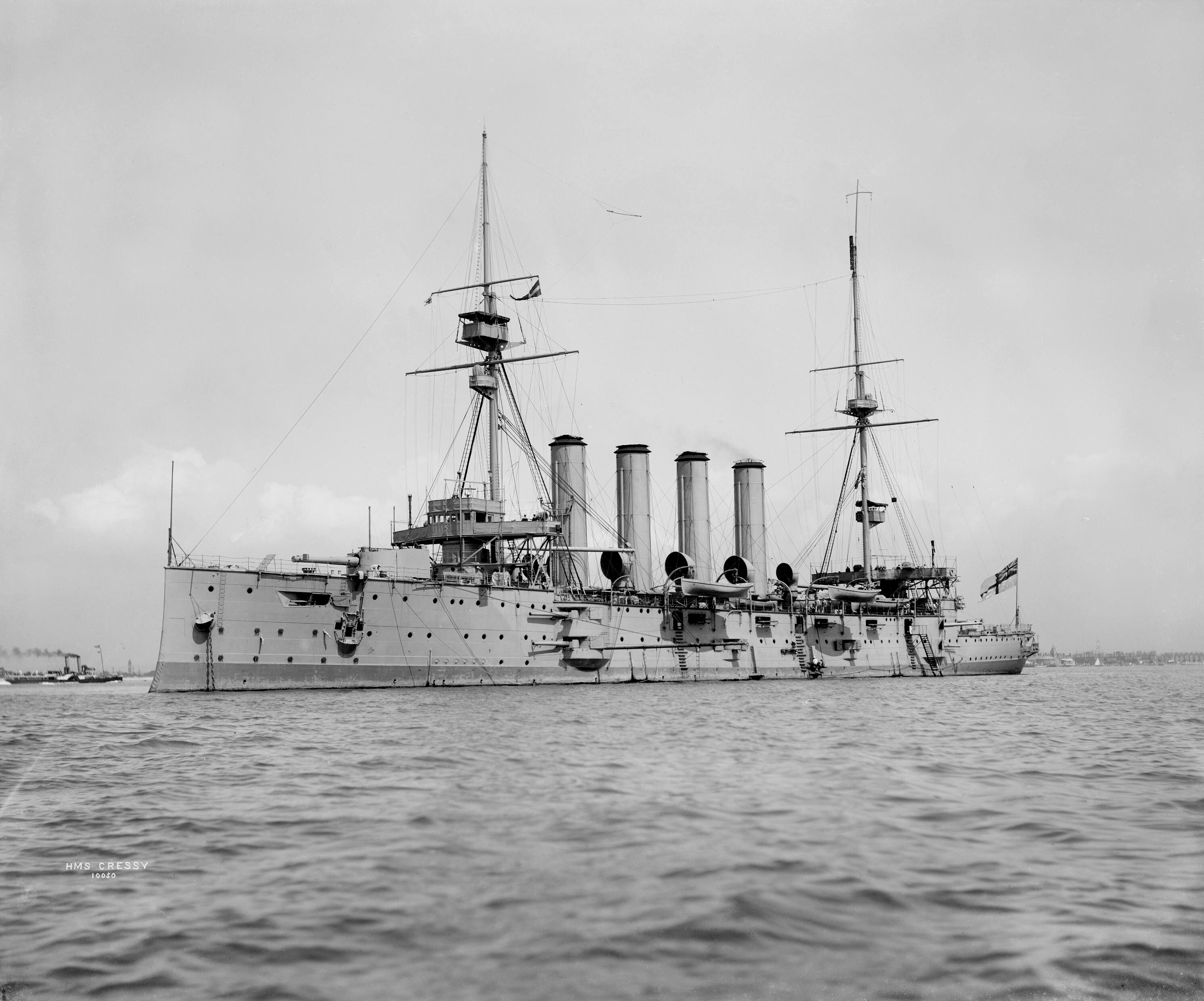
HMS Cressy

Britain, which had concluded as early as 1892 that it needed twice as many cruisers as any potential enemy to adequately protect its empire's sea lanes, responded to the perceived threat from France, Russia and, increasingly, Germany with a resumption of armored cruiser construction in 1898 with the Cressy class. At 21 knots, the Cressys were slower than the newer French cruisers. However, their 6-inch (152 mm) belt of Krupp steel was expected to keep out armor-piercing shells from a 6-inch (152 mm) quick-firing gun at likely battle ranges, while their two 9.2-inch (233.7 mm) and 12 6-inch (152 mm) guns offered comparable firepower. The 2,500-ton weight of their belt armor was an improvement over the 1809 tons of the otherwise similar Diadem class and very similar to that of the Canopus class of battleships. The Cressys were the beginning of a rapid expansion in British cruiser construction. Between 1899 and 1905, seven classes of armored cruisers were either completed or laid down, a total of 35 ships.

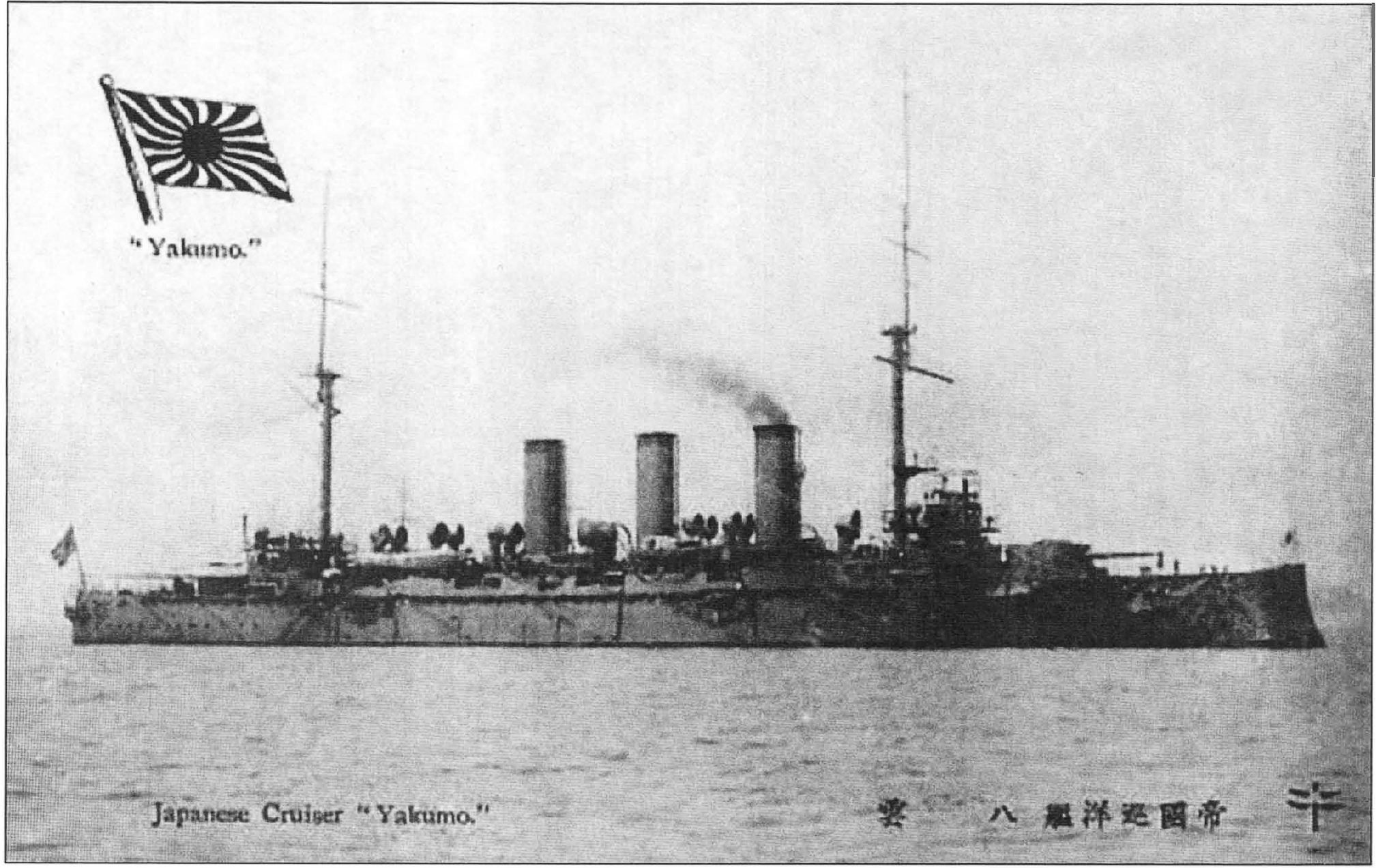
Yakumo in 1905

Japan, which now received British technical assistance in naval matters and purchased larger vessels from France and Britain, began an armored cruiser program of its own. With the end of the First Sino-Japanese War in 1895 and the return under pressure from Russia (in what became known as the "Triple Intervention") of the Liaotung peninsula to China, Japan began a 10-year naval build-up program, under the slogan "Perseverance and determination" (臥薪嘗胆, Gashinshōtan) in preparation for further confrontations. The core of this 109-ship build-up was the "Six-Six Program" of six battleships and six (eventually eight) armored cruisers comparable to the British Cressy class. Yakumo followed the basic pattern for these cruisers—on a 9,646 long tons (9,801 t) displacement, she carried four 7.99-inch (203 mm) and twelve 6-inch (150 mm) guns, was protected by a 3.5–6.7-inch (89–170 mm) main belt, 2.4-inch (61 mm) armored deck and 5.9-inch (150 mm) turret armor and steamed at 20.5 knots (23.6 mph; 38.0 km/h). They were considered a compromise between cruiser and battleship and were intended to augment capital ship strength in battle squadrons. This practice would persist until World War I.

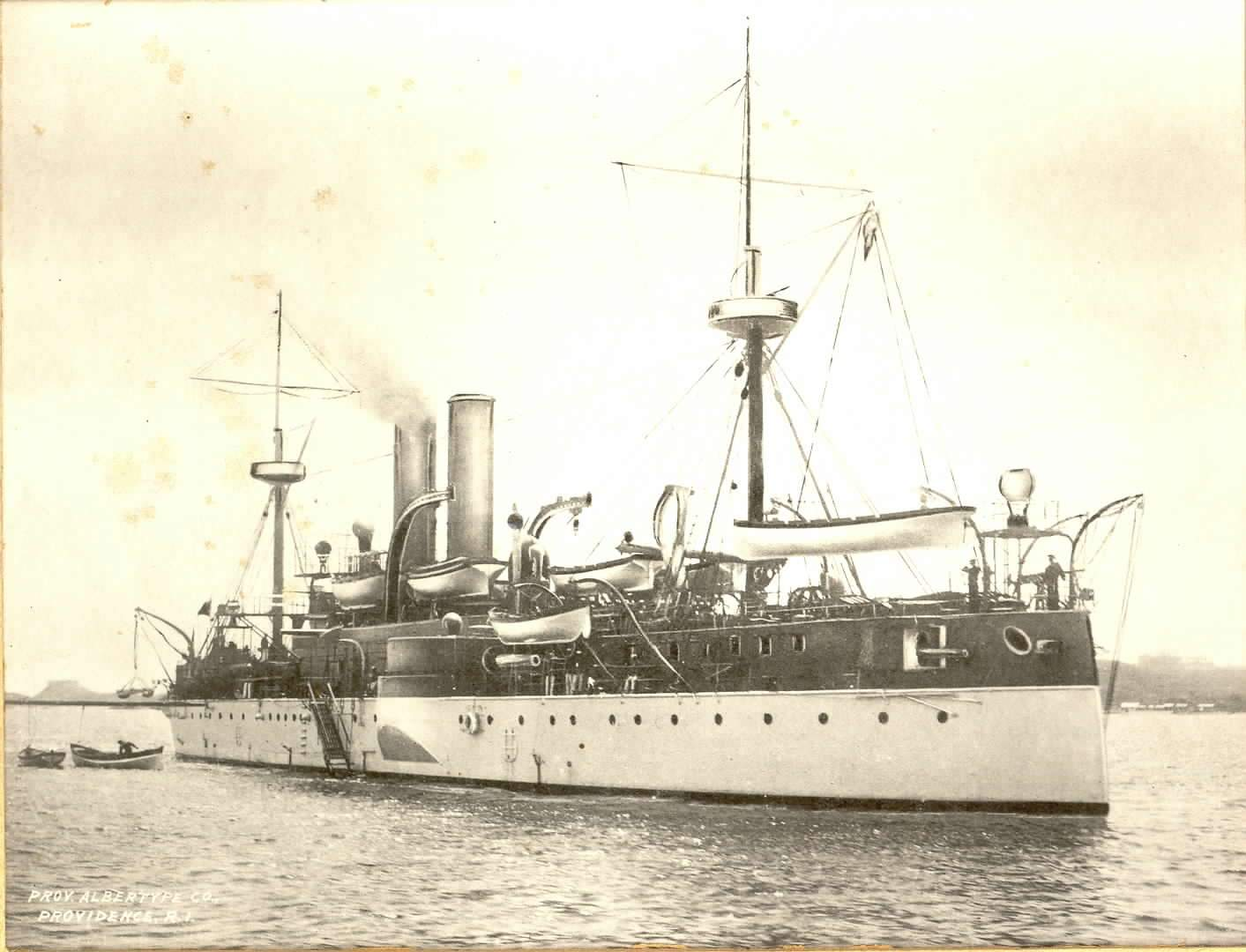
USS Maine

The first United States armored cruiser, USS Maine, was launched in 1889 but not completed until 1895 due to a three-year delay in the delivery of her armor plate. Armed with four 10-inch (254 mm) guns, mounted en echelon (with the fore turret sponsoned to starboard and the aft turret to port) to allow end-on fire for both turrets, and six 6-inch (152 mm) guns on broadside, she carried between 7 and 12 inches (178 to 305 mm) of belt armor and between 1 and 4 inches (25 to 102 mm) on her decks. However, Maine was laid down before Harvey or Krupp armor was available and could not benefit from the advantage in weight these much lighter armors offered. She was redesignated a "second-class battleship" in 1894, an awkward compromise reflecting that, at 16.45 knots, she was considerably slower than other cruisers and weaker than first-line battleships. Her destruction in Havana harbor in 1898 was a catalyst in starting the Spanish–American War.

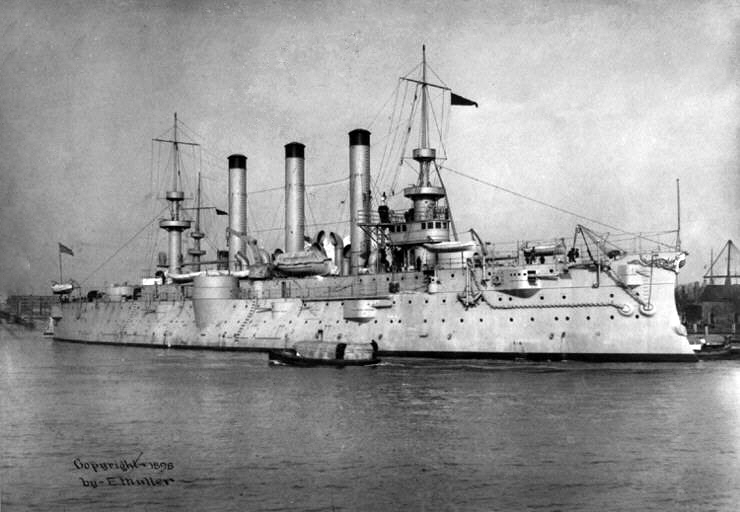
USS Brooklyn (1898)

Maine's immediate successors, New York and Brooklyn, launched in 1895 and 1896 respectively, carried thinner but newer armor than Maine, with 3 inches (76 mm) on her belt and 3 to 6 inches (76 to 152 mm) on her deck but better protected overall against rapid-fire weaponry. Their armor was comparable in thickness to that of Dupuy de Lôme but the French ship's armor covered a much greater area of the hull. The hull protection of both ships was superior to their main rival, the British Blake class, which were the largest cruisers at the time but had no side armor. Armed with six 8-inch (203 mm) guns, New York carried more heavy weapons than the French ship. Moreover, New York's builder diverged from the Navy blueprint by rearranging her boilers during construction; this allowed the installation of additional transverse and longitudinal bulkheads, which increased her underwater protection. Brooklyn was an improved version of the New York and Olympia designs, more heavily armed (with eight 8-inch (203 mm) and 12 5-inch (127 mm) guns) and with better sea-keeping abilities through the addition of a forecastle. After these two ships, the Navy concentrated on battleship construction until the Spanish–American War showed how cruisers could be "useful," in the words of General J. B. Crabtree, "and [showed] how desirable others would be."

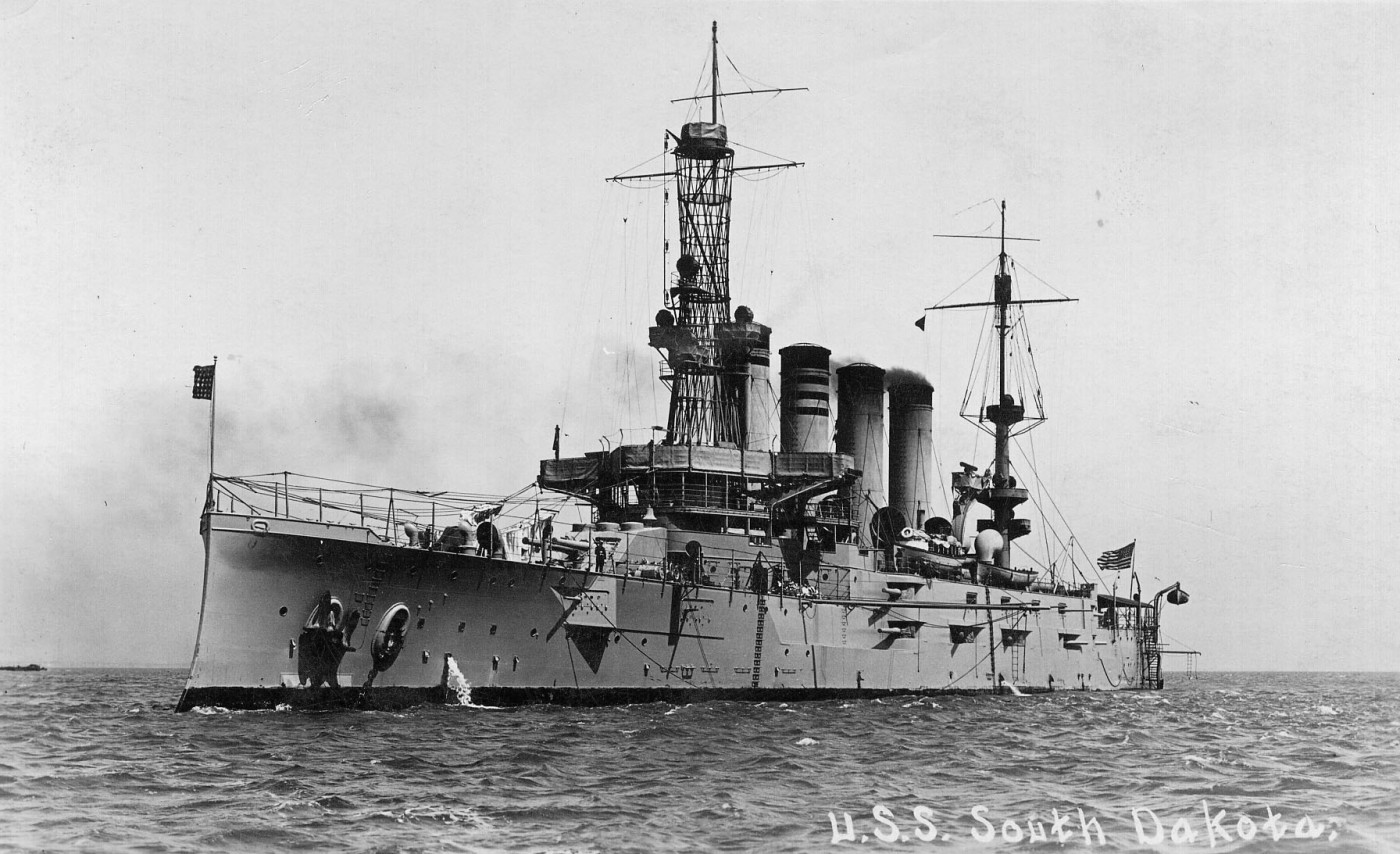
USS South Dakota, one of the Pennsylvania class

Shortly after the war ended, the Navy laid down six Pennsylvania-class armored cruisers to take advantage of lessons learned and better control the large sea areas the nation had just gained. Much larger than their predecessors (displacing 14,500 tons as compared to 8150 for New York), the Pennsylvanias "were closer to light battleships than to cruisers," according to naval historian William Friedman. They carried four 8-inch (203 mm) and 14 6-inch (152 mm) guns, 6 inches (152 mm) of armor on their belts, 6.5 inches (165 mm) on their turrets and 9 inches (229 mm) on their conning towers. Their deck armor was light at 1.5 inches (38 mm) for flat surfaces and 3 inches (76 mm) for sloped, a compromise made for faster speed (22 knots, compared with 20 knots for Brooklyn). Improved ammunition made their main guns as powerful as the 12-inch (305 mm) guns of the battleship Iowa and their use of state instead of city names, usually reserved for capital ships, emphasized their kinship.

The Spanish-American and First Sino-Japanese wars proved instrumental in spurring cruiser growth among all the major naval powers, according to naval historian Eric Osborne, "as they showcased the abilities of the modern ships in warfare." The only time cruisers were seen in any of their traditional role, he continues, was as blockade ships during the Spanish–American War. More often, they were seen fighting in a battle line. They would not been seen in their designed role until World War I.

Even with all their improvements and apparent performance, opinion on the armored cruiser was mixed. The 1904 edition of the Encyclopedia Americana quotes an otherwise unidentified Captain Walker, USN, in describing the role of the armored cruiser as "that of a vessel possessing in a high degree offensive and defensive qualities, with the capacity of delivering her attack at points far distant from her base in the least space of time." The same source defines an armored cruiser as "a battleship in which the qualities of offense and defense have been much reduced to gain high speed and great coal capacity" and adds, "... there are many who hold that the armored cruiser is an anomaly, something less than a battleship and more than a protected cruiser, performing satisfactorily the duties of neither, with no special function of her own and lacking the great desideratum in warships, ability to fight in proportion to her great size and cost." By 1914 the U.S. Navy in hearings before the House of Representatives gave testimony to the effect that no armored cruisers were further planned nor to it knowledge were armored cruisers being built by any major naval power worldwide.

=== Battle of Tsushima and final developments ===
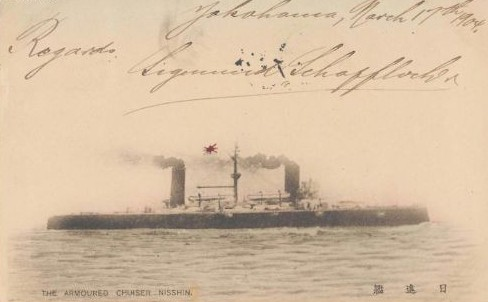
Nisshin (1905).

Armored cruisers were used with success in the line of battle by the Japanese at the Battle of Tsushima in 1905. Of the battle damage received by the Japanese, the armored cruiser Nisshin received eight hits, which destroyed three of her 8-inch (203 mm) guns, killed five crew members and injured 90 more (one of the wounded being Isoroku Yamamoto, who would later plan the attack on Pearl Harbor). None of the other Japanese armored cruisers suffered serious damage or large loss of life. Iwate was hit 16 times but no one onboard was killed and only 15 were wounded. Except for Kasagi, all the cruisers present at Tsushima that morning were still battle-ready in the evening.

The performance of the Japanese armored cruisers led to a boom in the construction of armored cruisers in the world's navies as some naval authorities concluded that the armored cruiser's superior speed could ensure survivability in a naval action against battleships; they did not take into account the Russian Baltic Fleet's inefficiency and tactical ineptitude during the battle. Danish Navy Commander William Hovgaard, who would later become president of New York Shipbuilding and serve on the U.S. Navy's Battleship Design Advisory Board, a group which would help plan the Iowa-class fast battleships in the 1930s, said, "The fighting capacity of the armored cruiser has reached a point which renders its participation in future fleet actions almost a certainty" and called for a "battleship-cruiser" which would possess the speed of a cruiser and the firepower of a capital ship Other naval authorities remained skeptical. Mahan called the interest in armored cruisers "a fad," then explained:

She is armored, and she is a cruiser; and what have you got? A ship to "lie in the line"? as our ancestors used to say. No, and Yes; that is to say, she may at a pinch, and at a risk that exceeds her powers. A cruiser? Yes, and No; for, order to give her armor and armament which do not fit the line, you have given tonnage beyond what is needed for the speed and coal endurance proper for a cruiser. By giving this tonnage to armor and armament you have taken it from other uses; either from increasing her own speed and endurance, or from providing another cruiser. You have in her more cruiser than she ought to have and less armored vessel, or less cruiser and more armored ship. I do not call this a combination, though I do call it a compromise.... I do not say you have a useless ship. I do say that you have not as useful a ship as, for the tonnage, you ought to have.

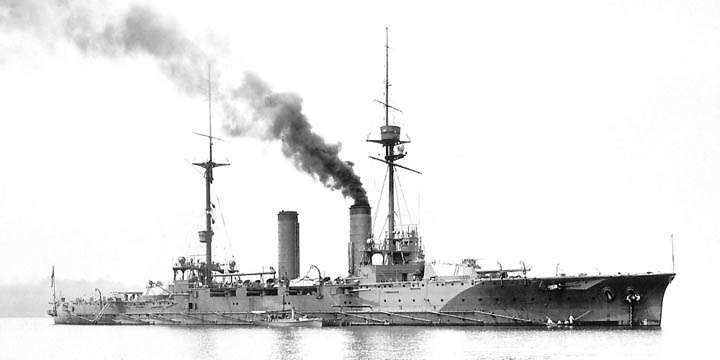
Japanese armored cruiser Tsukuba

Buoyed with their success at Tsushima, Japan laid down the four Tsukuba-class cruisers between 1905 and 1908. At a speed of 20.5 knots, they carried an extremely heavy main armament of four 12-inch (305 mm) guns, 8 inches (203 mm) of belt and turret armor and 3 inches (76 mm) of deck armor. The Tsukubas were intended to take the place of aging battleships and thus showed Japan's intention of continuing to use armored cruisers in fleet engagements. The U.S. Navy raised the main gun caliber of its cruisers with its Tennessee class, laid down between 1902 and 1904. These mounted four 10-inch (254 mm) and 16 6-inch (152 mm) guns, the former a size previously allocated to battleships. While they had thinner armor than the Pennsylvanias (5 inches (127 mm) on their belts and 1 inch (25 mm) on their decks) due to newly imposed congressional restraints on tonnage, they could still steam at 22 knots. They were built as a fast, powerful response in the eventuality of a Pacific war and were the largest and last American armored cruisers built.

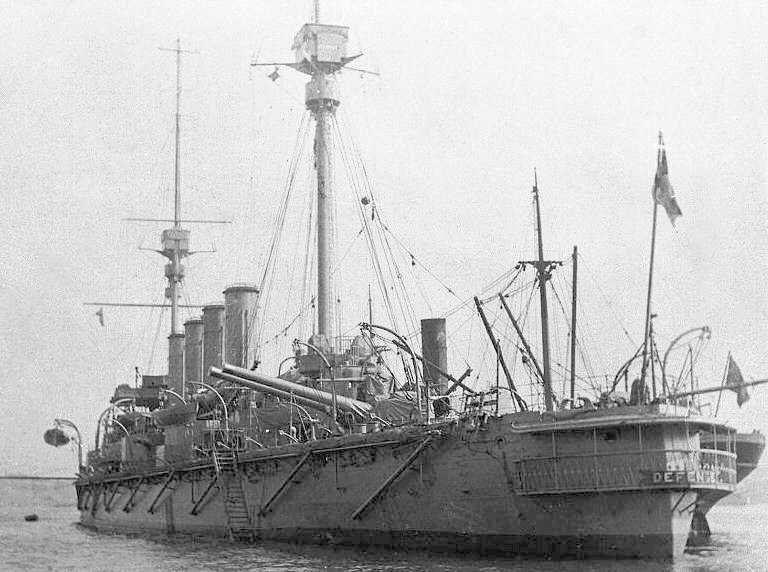
Stern view of HMS Defence, one of the Minotaur class

The British also considered 10-inch (254 mm) and 12-inch (305 mm) guns for its Minotaur-class cruisers, the culmination of its armored cruiser building program. They displaced 14,600 tons, were capable of 23 knots and were armed with four 9.2-inch (234 mm) and 10 7.5-inch (191 mm) guns. By the time these ships were commissioned, Britain possessed the largest armored cruiser force in the world. Undaunted and fully engaged in a naval arms race with the British, the Germans also continued to build armored cruisers, partly from their faith in them as fighting units and commerce raiders, partly from Japan's success. Between 1897 and 1906 they laid down eight of them for use on overseas stations. The initial two, SMS Fürst Bismarck and SMS Prinz Heinrich, were armed with 9.44-inch (240 mm) guns; the six that followed had 8.2-inch (208 mm) guns of a more modern design. The final pair, Scharnhorst and Gneisenau, displaced 12,781 tons, steamed at 23.5 knots, carried 6 inches (152 mm) of belt and 2 inches (51 mm) of deck armor and were armed with eight 8.2-inch (208 mm) guns.

Another powerful armored cruiser was the Russian Rurik, completed in 1908. Armed with four 10-inch (254 mm) in two twin turrets fore and aft and eight 8-inch (203 mm) in turrets along the ship's sides, she displaced 15,190 tons and carried a 6-inch (152 mm) belt, two armored decks and 8-inch (203 mm) armor on her turrets and conning tower. Her top speed was 21 knots. Rurik was unusual in that she was Russian designed but British built; the Russian Navy was not usually a customer of British shipyards. She was reportedly one of the best armored cruisers built, with an advanced sprinkler protection for the magazines. Intended as the first of a three-ship class, Rurik's sisters were cancelled with the advent of the battlecruiser HMS Invincible.

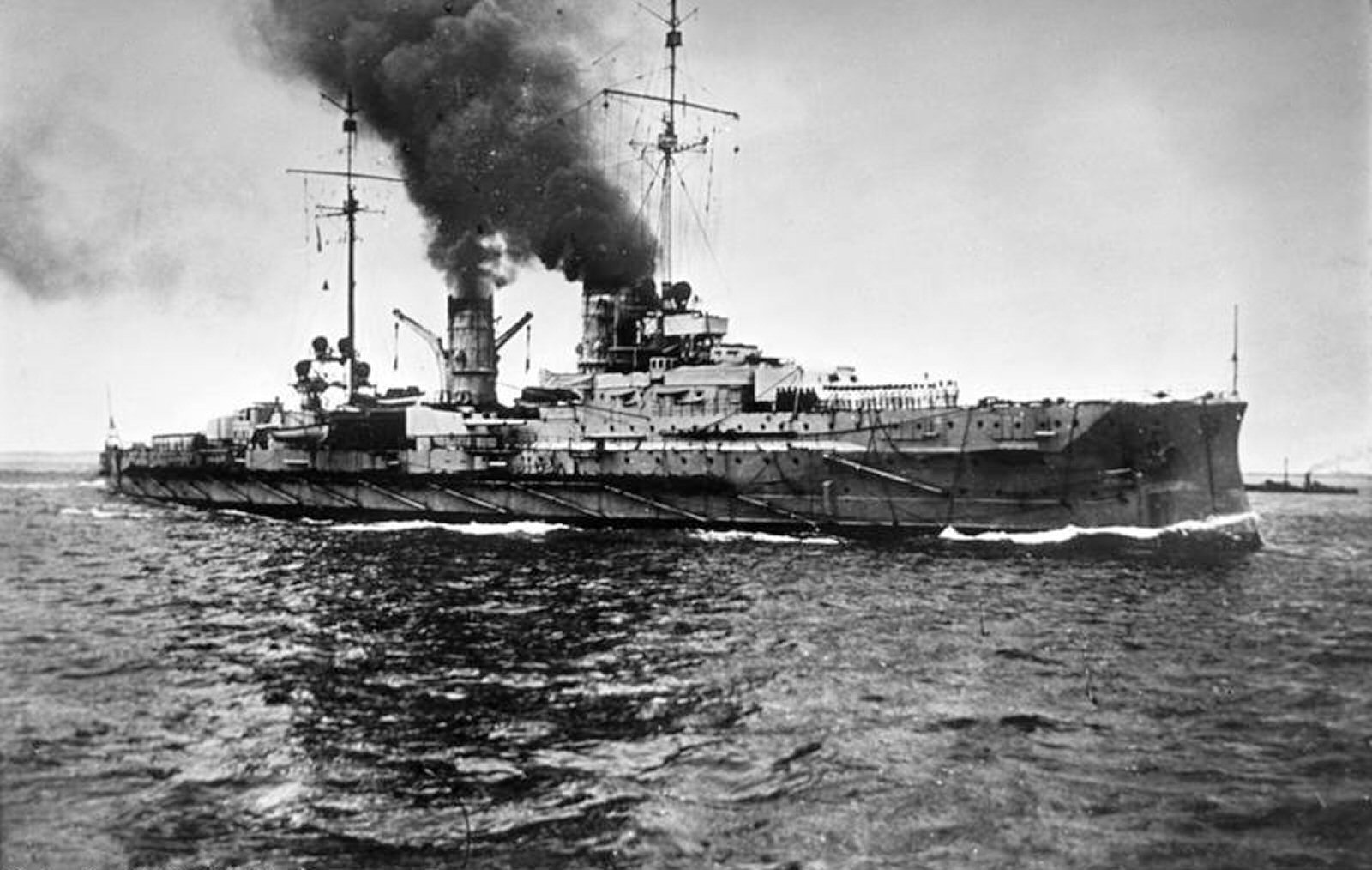
SMS Blücher

"The supreme embodiment of the armored cruiser," in historian Robert K. Massie's words, was the German ship SMS Blücher. An enlarged version of the Scharnhorst class with a speed of 24.25 knots, armed with 12 8.2-inch (208 mm) and eight 5.9-inch (150 mm) guns, Blücher was planned as an armored cruiser in part because the British had misled the Germans on the Invincibles then being constructed. The Germans expected these new British ships to be armed with six or eight 9.2 in (23 cm) guns. One week after the final decision to construct Blücher, the German naval attache learned they would carry eight 30.5 cm (12.0 in) guns, the same type mounted on battleships. With no funds available to redesign Blücher, work was ordered to proceed as scheduled. Although much more powerful than a typical armored cruiser, she was significantly weaker than the new British battlecruisers. According to the historian Aidan Dodson, Blücher was "...overall a far better balanced design" compared to Invincible, as while Blücher's 21 cm armament was clearly outclassed by the eight 30.5 cm (12 in) guns of the Invincibles in terms of power, the guns had similar maximum effective ranges, and Blücher had better armor protection.

=== Appearance of the battlecruiser ===
By the time these new armored cruisers were entering service, such types of ships had reached the end of its development. Tactics and technology favored fighting power over long to medium ranges, which demanded an armament of primarily large caliber guns and a speed higher than that of battleships, preferably by at least 30 percent, to fulfill its traditional role as scout for the fleet and the newly acquired one of participating with battleships in a naval encounter. Thirty percent was the ratio by which frigates had been faster than ships of the line in the days of sail. If a battleship sailed at 20 knots, this would mean that an armored cruiser would have to steam at least 26 or 27 knots. To fulfill these criteria, however, armored cruisers would have to be built much larger and take on a different form than they had in the past. First Sea Lord "Jacky" Fisher, an advocate of armored cruisers as more useful than battleships to safeguard British trade and territorial interests, saw his efforts justified; his belief that "speed is armor" would lead him to create the battlecruiser.

The battlecruiser HMS Invincible and her two sister ships were designed specifically to fulfill these requirements. In a sense they were an extension of the armored cruiser as a fast, heavily armed scout, commerce protector and cruiser-destroyer, reflected in the term originally ascribed to them, "large armored cruiser." However, the battlecruisers were much larger than armored cruisers, allowing them to be faster, more heavily armed, and better-protected, so battlecruisers were able to outpace armored cruisers, stay out of range of their weapons and destroy them with relative impunity. Because they carried the heavy guns normally ascribed to battleships, they could also theoretically hold their place in a battle line more readily than armored cruisers and serve as the "battleship-cruiser" for which Hovgaard had argued after Tsushima. All these factors made battlecruisers attractive fighting units, although Britain, Germany and Japan would be the only powers to build them. They also meant that the armored cruiser as it had been known was now outmoded and no more were built after 1910. The United States Naval Institute put the matter bluntly in its 1908 written proceedings:

It is very doubtful if an armored cruiser of the Colorado class would dare even tackle a monitor, for fear that one of the latter's shot might hit a vital spot, and if it did she would lose her only raison d'etre, for a crippled cruiser would be useless as a cruiser, and still not fit to "lie in the line."... It may be urged that an armored cruiser was never intended to fight a battleship. Then what is she intended for? Surely not as a scout or a commerce destroyer, for vessels a fifth the displacement could do this work as well, and numbers are required here, not strength.... If she is to overtake a weaker enemy, you must first assume a smaller enemy, otherwise she could not have superiority in both speed and strength. By escaping from a stronger enemy she will never win wars.

Later in the same address is this: "Every argument used against [armored cruisers] holds true for battle-cruisers of the Invincible type, except that the latter, if wounded, would be fit to lie in the line, owing to her great armament. If it is hoped to fight at such great ranges that her 7-inch belt and 5-inch side will be of value, then the armor of battleships is wrong, not in principle, but in distribution."

=== World War I ===
Although pre-dreadnought battleships and armored cruisers were outclassed by modern battleship and battlecruiser designs, respectively, armored cruisers still played an active role in World War I. Their armor and firepower was sufficient to defeat other cruiser types and armed merchant vessels, while their speed and range made them particularly useful for extended operations out in the high seas. Some German and Royal Navy vessels, like HMS Good Hope, were allocated to remote naval squadrons. Many other vessels however, were formed into independent squadrons for patrolling European waters and accompanied capital ships every time the latter made forays out of port.

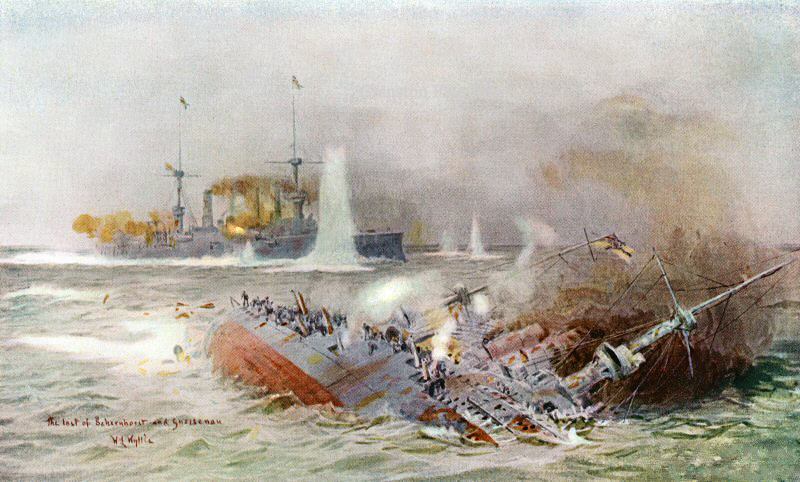
Battle of the Falkland Islands by W.L. Wyllie

At the Battle of Coronel, the German armored cruisers SMS Scharnhorst and SMS Gneisenau scored a resounding victory over British naval forces from the West Indies Station. With newer ships, superior gunnery and optimal logistics, the Germans sank the Royal Navy armored cruisers HMS Monmouth and HMS Good Hope, with the loss of over 1,500 British sailors and officers (including Rear-Admiral Christopher Cradock). This was one of the last battles involving armored cruisers as the chief adversaries; all subsequent engagements were dominated by battlecruisers and dreadnought battleships. Moreover, the timing could not have been worse for British morale. Six weeks earlier, the armored cruisers HMS Cressy, HMS Hogue and HMS Aboukir had all been sunk on the same day by the German submarine U-9.

Five weeks later, the Battle of the Falkland Islands showed graphically how much technology and tactics had changed. SMS Scharnhorst and SMS Gneisenau were sunk by a British force of the battlecruisers HMS Invincible and HMS Inflexible, three armoured cruisers and two light cruisers. The German armored cruisers were too slow to outrun their pursuers, and their initially accurate gunnery failed to inflict serious damage on the British battlecruisers. The British 12-inch guns turned the tide of battle once they started scoring hits on the Germans, and the German armored cruisers were fatally crippled before they had a chance to close the range and use their superior secondary armament. This victory seemed to validate Lord "Jacky" Fisher's justification in building battlecruisers—to track down and destroy armored cruisers with vessels possessing superior speed and firepower. The German force commander Admiral Maximilian von Spee had been wary of the Allies' battlecruisers, especially the Imperial Japanese Navy and the Royal Australian Navy—in fact he described the latter's flagship, the battlecruiser HMAS Australia, as being superior to his entire force by itself. At the Falklands, he had already deduced the battle was lost when he missed the chance to attack the British battlecruisers in port.

During the Battle of Dogger Bank, Blücher was crippled by a shell from a British battlecruiser, which slowed Blücher to 17 knots and eventually sealed her fate. Admiral Franz von Hipper chose to let Blücher go down so his more valuable battlecruisers could escape.

HMS Warrior, HMS Defence and HMS Black Prince were lost at the Battle of Jutland when they inadvertently came into sight and range of the German Navy's battle line, which included several battlecruisers and dreadnought battleships. The armor belt was shown to be far less than required to survive the 280mm (11 inch) and 300 mm (12 inch) shells of more modern dreadnoughts and battlecruisers and the cruisers were too slow to get away from them. The final nail in the coffin for the armored cruiser type was in the development of capped armor-piercing shells. The Harvey and Krupp Cemented armor that had looked to offer protection failed when hit with soft capped AP shells of large enough size. Later hard capped AP shell would only make the matter worse.

=== Post-World War I ===
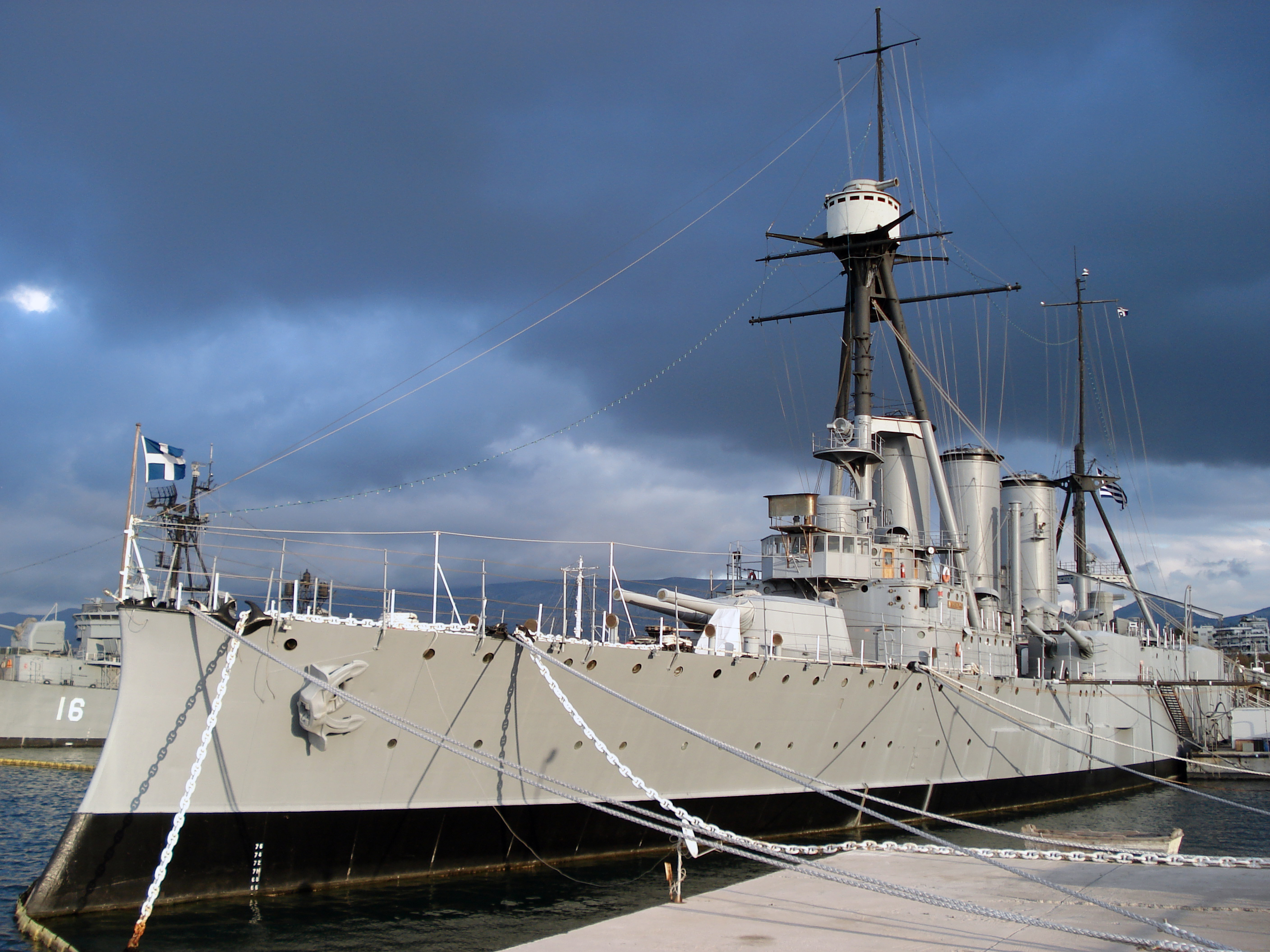
The Greek cruiser Georgios Averof.

After the end of World War I, many of the surviving armored cruisers were sold for scrap. The Washington Naval Treaty of 1922 placed strict limits on the numbers of "capital ships" possessed by the navies of the great powers. A "capital ship" was defined as any vessel of over 10,000 tons displacement or with guns over 8-in caliber, and several more armored cruisers were decommissioned to comply with the terms of the treaty. The London Naval Treaty of 1930 introduced further limits on cruiser tonnage, and the former role of the armored cruiser was occupied by more modern light cruisers and heavy cruisers (and, in the case of the German navy, panzerschiffe).

Only a small number of armored cruisers survived these limitations, though a handful saw action in World War II in marginal roles;

The Hellenic Navy's Georgios Averof, constructed in 1909, served with the British Navy as a convoy escort in the Indian Ocean after the fall of Greece, while a number of Japanese armored cruisers were still active as minelayers or training vessels.

The Imperial Japanese Navy armored cruisers Asama, Izumo, Tokiwa, Iwate, Yakumo, Azuma, & Kasuga were used as training, support, and anti-aircraft ships during the war near the Japanese home islands. Most were sunk by Allied bombings in Japanese harbors.

The Regia Marina's San Giorgio was deployed to Spain to protected Italian interests during the Spanish Civil War. During World War II, she was heavily utilized at the Siege of Tobruk. There she provided anti-aircraft cover and naval gunfire support to Italian units. She was heavily damaged by British aircraft and was scuttled to prevent her capture. Her sister ship, San Marco was decommissioned in 1931 and used as a radio controlled target ship. In 1943, she was scuttled to prevent her capture by the Germans.

The United States Navy's USS Rochester, decommissioned since 1933, was moored in Subic Bay and used as a receiving ship and anti-aircraft platform. She was later scuttled to prevent her capture by the Japanese during the Invasion of The Philippines.

The Argentine Navy's ARA General Belgrano and ARA Pueyrredón served until 1947 and 1954 respectfully.

The Swedish Navy's HSwMS Fylgia underwent an extensive modernization from 1939 to 1940 and conducted neutrality patrols in the Baltic Sea during World War II. She continued service until 1953.

The only armored cruiser still considered to be in existence, as well as in active duty, is the aforementioned Georgios Averof, preserved as a museum in Palaio Faliro, Greece.

== Differences with heavy cruisers ==
The armored cruiser was not a close ancestor of heavy cruisers, even though the name might suggest this. The armored cruiser type had come about in a time of transition as one technology after another presented itself. Boilers had become better (though still in need of improvement), and Krupp cemented armor and compound steam engines had arrived. The rate of change was nothing less than staggering and any ship more than 20 years old was found to be completely obsolete. The Italian Navy, unable to afford battleships, produced the Garibaldi-class cruiser of 7,500 tons displacement which was an international success. William H. White DNC of the British Royal Navy was taken by the design and presented the design for the Cressy-class cruiser of 12,000 tons displacement designed from the onset as an adjunct to the pre-dreadnought battle line, on 3 May 1897. As such the armored cruiser is the direct predecessor of and inspiration for the battlecruiser.

The heavy cruiser was a direct product of the First London Naval Treaty of 1930, which divided cruisers into 2 classes between those with larger than 6.1" main guns and those with smaller main guns with both remaining within the limits of the Washington Naval Treaty which limited cruisers to a standard displacement of no more than 10,000 tons, with main guns not exceeding 8 inches (203 mm) caliber. There were also important technical differences between the heavy cruiser and the armored cruiser, some of which reflected the generational gap between them. Heavy cruisers were typically powered by oil-fired superheated steam boilers and steam turbine engines, and were capable of far faster speeds than armored cruisers (propelled by coal-fired reciprocating steam engines of their era) ever had been. Countries withdrawing from the Washington Treaty and the London Naval Treaty of 1930 and Second London Naval Treaty 1936 eventually rendered all limitations on heavy cruisers moot, although the only supersized or large cruisers actually built were the two members of the Alaska class.

Armored cruisers were often pressed into the main line of battle against battlecruisers and dreadnought battleships (battles of the Falkland Islands, Dogger Bank and Jutland). By contrast, heavy cruisers and light cruisers were not expected to be deployed as such, although there had been some notable engagements (battles of the Denmark Strait, Matapan, Guadalcanal and Surigao Strait).

== See also ==
- List of cruisers of the United States Navy § Armored cruisers (ACR)
- List of ships of World War II
- List of cruisers of the Second World War
- List of cruisers of World War I
