= List of ship commissionings in 1911 =

The list of ship commissionings in 1911 is a chronological list of ships commissioned in 1911. In cases where no official commissioning ceremony was held, the date of service entry may be used instead.

Date	Operator	Ship	Class and type	Notes
January 11	Royal Navy	Neptune	Neptune-class battleship	
January 15	Austro-Hungarian Navy	Radetzky	Radetzky-class battleship	
February 24	Royal Navy	Indefatigable	Indefatigable-class battlecruiser	
May 16	Royal Hellenic Navy	Georgios Averof	Pisa-class armored cruiser	
June 16	Imperial German Navy	Cöln	Kolberg-class cruiser	
July 1	Imperial German Navy	Thüringen	Helgoland-class battleship	
July 24	French Navy	Danton	Danton-class battleship	
July 25	French Navy	Condorcet	Danton-class battleship	
July 25	French Navy	Diderot	Danton-class battleship	
July 31	Royal Navy	Hercules	Colossus-class battleship	
August 1	French Navy	Mirabeau	Danton-class battleship	
August 1	Imperial German Navy	Ostfriesland	Helgoland-class battleship	
August 5	French Navy	Vergniaud	Danton-class battleship	
August 8	Royal Navy	Colossus	Colossus-class battleship	
August 23	Imperial German Navy	Helgoland	Helgoland-class battleship	
August 30	Imperial German Navy	Moltke	Moltke-class battlecruiser	
August 31	United States Navy	Utah	Florida-class battleship	
September 5	United States Navy	Florida	Florida-class battleship	
November 22	Austro-Hungarian Navy	Zrínyi	Radetzky-class battleship	
December 1	Royal Netherlands Navy	O 2	O 2-class submarine	
December 18	French Navy	Voltaire	Danton-class battleship	
December 21	Royal Netherlands Navy	Medusa	Hydra-class minelayer	
unknown date	Royal Danish Navy	Absalon	Patrol vessel	
