= French battleship Condorcet =

French Danton-class semi-dreadnought

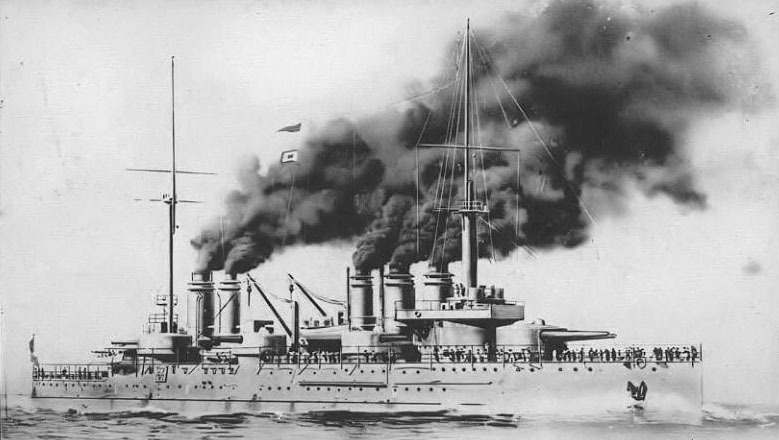
- Condorcet underway

History

France
- Name: Condorcet
- Namesake: Marquis de Condorcet
- Builder: Ateliers et Chantiers de la Loire, Saint-Nazaire
- Laid down: 23 August 1907
- Launched: 20 April 1909
- Commissioned: 25 July 1911
- Reclassified: as training ship, 1925
- Stricken: 1931
- Fate: Listed for sale, 14 December 1945; Breaking up completed by about 1949

General characteristics
- Class & type: Danton class
- Type: Semi-dreadnought battleship
- Displacement: 18,754 t (18,458 long tons) (normal)
- Length: 146.6 m (481 ft) (o/a)
- Beam: 25.8 m (84 ft 8 in)
- Draft: 8.44 m (27 ft 8 in)
- Installed power: 26 Belleville boilers; 22,500 PS (16,500 kW)
- Propulsion: 4 shafts; 4 steam turbines
- Speed: 19.25 knots (35.7 km/h; 22.2 mph)
- Complement: 25 officers and 831 enlisted men
- Armament: 2 × twin 305 mm (12 in) guns; 6 × twin 240 mm (9.4 in) guns; 16 × single 75 mm (3 in) guns; 10 × single 47 mm (1.9 in) guns; 2 × 450 mm (17.7 in) torpedo tubes
- Armor: Belt: 180–250 mm (7.1–9.8 in); Turrets: 260–340 mm (10.2–13.4 in); Conning tower: 266 mm (10.5 in)

Condorcet was one of the six Danton-class semi-dreadnought battleships built for the French Navy in the early 20th century. When World War I began in August 1914, she unsuccessfully searched for the German battlecruiser SMS Goeben and the light cruiser SMS Breslau in the Western and Central Mediterranean. Later that month, the ship participated in the Battle of Antivari in the Adriatic Sea and helped to sink an Austro-Hungarian protected cruiser. Condorcet spent most of the rest of the war blockading the Straits of Otranto and the Dardanelles to keep German, Austro-Hungarian and Turkish warships bottled up.

After the war, she was modernized in 1923–1925 and subsequently became a training ship. In 1931, the ship was converted into an accommodation hulk. Condorcet was captured intact when the Germans occupied Vichy France in November 1942 and was used by them to house sailors of their navy (Kriegsmarine). She was badly damaged by Allied bombing in 1944, but was later raised and scrapped by 1949.

== Design and description ==
Although the Danton-class battleships were a significant improvement from the preceding Liberté class, they were outclassed by the advent of the dreadnought well before they were completed. This, combined with other poor traits, including the great weight in coal they had to carry, made them unsuccessful ships overall, though their numerous rapid-firing guns were of some use in the Mediterranean.

Condorcet was 146.6 meters (481 ft 0 in) long overall and had a beam of 25.8 m (84 ft 8 in) and a full-load draft of 9.2 m (30 ft 2 in). She displaced 19,736 metric tons (19,424 long tons) at deep load and had a crew of 681 officers and enlisted men. The ship was powered by four Parsons steam turbines using steam generated by twenty-six Niclausse boilers. The turbines were rated at 22,500 shaft horsepower (16,800 kW) and provided a top speed of around 19 knots (35 km/h; 22 mph). Condorcet reached a top speed of 19.7 knots (36.5 km/h; 22.7 mph) on her sea trials. She carried a maximum of 2,027 tonnes (1,995 long tons) of coal which allowed her to steam for 3,370 miles (2,930 nmi) at a speed of 10 knots (19 km/h; 12 mph).

Condorcet's main battery consisted of four 305mm/45 Modèle 1906 guns mounted in two twin gun turrets, one forward and one aft. The secondary battery consisted of twelve 240mm/50 Modèle 1902 guns in twin turrets, three on each side of the ship. A number of smaller guns were carried for defense against torpedo boats. These included sixteen 75 mm (3.0 in) L/65 guns and ten 47-millimetre (1.9 in) Hotchkiss guns. The ship was also armed with two submerged 450 mm (17.7 in) torpedo tubes. The ship's main belt was 270 mm (10.6 in) thick and the main battery was protected by up to 300 mm (11.8 in) of armor. The conning tower also had 300 mm thick sides.

=== Wartime modifications ===
During the war, 75 mm anti-aircraft guns were installed on the roofs of the ship's two forward 240 mm gun turrets. During 1918, the mainmast was shortened to allow the ship to fly a captive kite balloon and the elevation of the 240 mm guns was increased which extended their range to 18,000 meters (20,000 yd).

== Career ==
Construction of Condorcet was begun on 26 December 1906 by Ateliers et Chantiers de la Loire in Saint-Nazaire and the ship was laid down on 23 August 1907. She was launched on 20 April 1909 and was completed on 25 July 1911. Condorcet was initially assigned to the 1st Division of the 1st Squadron (escadre) of the Mediterranean Fleet when she was commissioned. The ship participated in combined fleet maneuvers between Provence and Tunisia in May–June 1913 and the subsequent naval review conducted by the President of France, Raymond Poincaré on 7 June 1913. Afterwards, Condorcet joined her squadron in its tour of the Eastern Mediterranean in October–December 1913 and participated in the grand fleet exercise in the Mediterranean in May 1914.

=== World War I ===
At the beginning of the war, the ship, together with her sister Vergniaud and the dreadnought Courbet, unsuccessfully searched for the German battlecruiser Goeben and the light cruiser Breslau in the Balearic Islands. On 9 August, Condorcet cruised the Strait of Sicily in an attempt to prevent the German ships from breaking out to the West. On 16 August 1914 the combined Anglo-French Fleet under Admiral Auguste Boué de Lapeyrère, including Condorcet, made a sweep of the Adriatic Sea. The Allied ships encountered the Austro-Hungarian cruiser SMS Zenta, escorted by the destroyer SMS Ulan, blockading the coast of Montenegro. There were too many ships for Zenta to escape, so she remained behind to allow Ulan to get away and was sunk by gunfire during the Battle of Antivari off the coast of Bar, Montenegro.

Condorcet subsequently participated in a number of raids into the Adriatic later in the year and patrolled the Ionian Islands. From December 1914 to 1916, the ship participated in the distant blockade of the Straits of Otranto while based in Corfu. On 1 December 1916, Condorcet was in Athens and contributed troops to the Allied attempt to ensure Greek acquiescence to Allied operations in Macedonia. Shortly afterwards, she was transferred to Mudros to prevent Goeben from breaking out into the Mediterranean and remained there until September 1917. The ship was transferred to the 2nd Division of the 1st Squadron in May 1918 and returned to Mudros where she remained for the rest of the war.

=== Postwar career ===
From 6 December 1918 to 2 March 1919, Condorcet represented France in the Allied squadron in Fiume that supervised the settlement of the Yugoslav question. Afterwards, the ship was assigned to the Channel Division of the French Navy. She was modernized in 1923–24 to improve her underwater protection and her four aft 75 mm guns were removed. Together with her sisters Diderot and Voltaire, she was assigned to the Training Division at Toulon. Condorcet housed the torpedo and electrical schools and had a torpedo tube fitted on the port side of her quarterdeck. She was partially disarmed in 1931 and converted into an accommodation hulk; by 1939 her propellers had been removed. The famous underwater explorer Jacques Cousteau began diving while stationed aboard the ship in 1936.

In April 1941, the ship was towed to sea to evaluate the propellant used by the battleship Richelieu during the Battle of Dakar on 24 September 1940. One 38-centimetre (15 in) gun had an explosion in the breech and the propellant for the shell was thought to be the cause. A number of shots were successfully fired from Condorcet's aft turret by remote control that exonerated the propellant. The following July, the ship was modified to house the signal, radio and electrician's schools. Berthing areas were installed in the bases of four funnels, which had been removed previously, and the latest radio equipment was installed for the students to train on. On 10 September 1941, Condorcet was accidentally rammed by the submarine Le Glorieux as she was leaving drydock. The impact punctured the ship's hull and flooded one compartment which required Condorcet to be drydocked for repairs. The ship was captured intact by the Germans when they occupied Vichy France on 27 November 1942. Unlike the bulk of the French Fleet in Toulon, Condorcet was not scuttled because she had trainees aboard. Used by the Germans as a barracks ship, she was badly damaged by Allied aircraft in August 1944 and scuttled that same month by the Germans.

Some of her 240 mm guns were used by the Germans in a coastal battery on the north bank of the Gironde estuary on the Bay of Biscay in 1944.

The ship was salvaged in September 1945 and listed for sale on 14 December. Condorcet's breaking up was completed about 1949.

== Bibliography ==
- Cousteau, Jean-Michel (2010). My Father, the Captain: My Life With Jacques Cousteau. Washington, D.C.: National Geographic Society. ISBN 978-1-42620683-2.
- Gardiner, Robert & Gray, Randal, eds. (1985). Conway's All the World's Fighting Ships 1906–1921. Annapolis, Maryland: Naval Institute Press. ISBN 0-85177-245-5.
- Gille, Eric (1999). Cent ans de cuirassés français [A Century of French Battleships] (in French). Nantes: Marines édition. ISBN 2-909-675-50-5.
- Halpern, Paul G. (2004). The Battle of the Otranto Straits: Controlling the Gateway to the Adriatic in World War I. Bloomington, Indiana: Indiana University Press. ISBN 978-0-253-34379-6.
- Jordan, John & Caresse, Philippe (2017). French Battleships of World War One. Annapolis, Maryland: Naval Institute Press. ISBN 978-1-59114-639-1.
- Meirat, Jean (1978). "French Battleships Vernigaud and Condorcet". F. P. D. S. Newsletter. VI (1). Akron, Ohio: F. P. D. S.: 5–6. OCLC 41554533.
- Silverstone, Paul H. (1984). Directory of the World's Capital Ships. New York: Hippocrene Books. ISBN 0-88254-979-0.
