= French battleship Mirabeau =

One of six Danton-class semi-dreadnought battleships for the French Navy

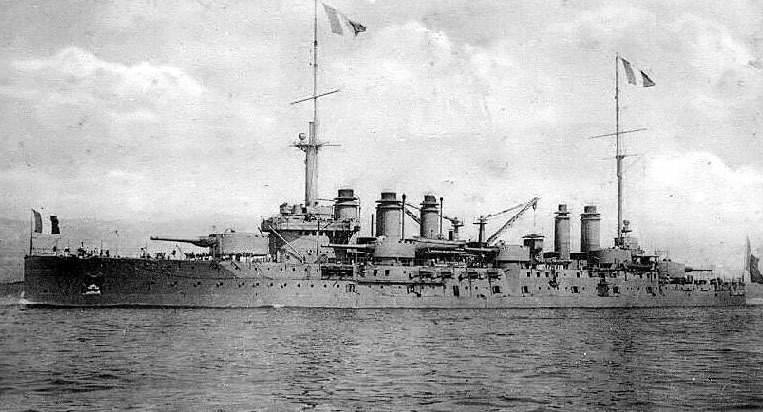
- A postcard of her sister ship Vergniaud

History

France
- Name: Mirabeau
- Namesake: Honoré Riqueti, comte de Mirabeau
- Builder: Arsenal de Lorient
- Laid down: 4 May 1908
- Launched: 28 October 1909
- Completed: 1 August 1911
- Stricken: 22 August 1919
- Fate: Scrapped, 28 April 1922

General characteristics
- Class & type: Danton class
- Type: Semi-dreadnought battleship
- Displacement: 18,754 t (18,458 long tons) (normal)
- Length: 146.6 m (481 ft) (o/a)
- Beam: 25.8 m (84 ft 8 in)
- Draft: 8.44 m (27 ft 8 in)
- Installed power: 26 Belleville boilers; 22,500 PS (16,500 kW)
- Propulsion: 4 shafts; 4 steam turbines
- Speed: 19.25 knots (35.7 km/h; 22.2 mph)
- Complement: 25 officers and 831 enlisted men
- Armament: 2 × twin 305 mm (12 in) guns; 6 × twin 240 mm (9.4 in) guns; 16 × single 75 mm (3 in) guns; 10 × single 47 mm (1.9 in) guns; 2 × 450 mm (17.7 in) torpedo tubes
- Armor: Belt: 180–250 mm (7.1–9.8 in); Turrets: 260–340 mm (10.2–13.4 in); Conning tower: 266 mm (10.5 in)

Mirabeau was one of the six Danton-class semi-dreadnought battleships built for the Marine Nationale (French Navy) in the first decade of the twentieth century. Completed in 1911, the ship often served as a flagship before the beginning of World War I three years later. Mirabeau spent the war in the Mediterranean Sea and spent most of her time blockading the Straits of Otranto and the Dardanelles to prevent German, Austro-Hungarian and Ottoman warships from breaking out into the Mediterranean. She also participated in the attempt to ensure Greek acquiescence to Allied operations in Macedonia in late 1916. Mirabeau briefly participated in the occupation of Constantinople after the end of the war in late 1918 and was deployed in the Black Sea in early 1919 during the Allied intervention in the Russian Civil War. She ran aground in February 1919 off the coast of the Crimea and could not be refloated until some of her guns, armor and boilers were removed. After returning to France later that year, the ship was stricken from the Navy List. Mirabeau was given to a salvage company as payment for salvaging another battleship and broken up in 1922.

== Design and description ==
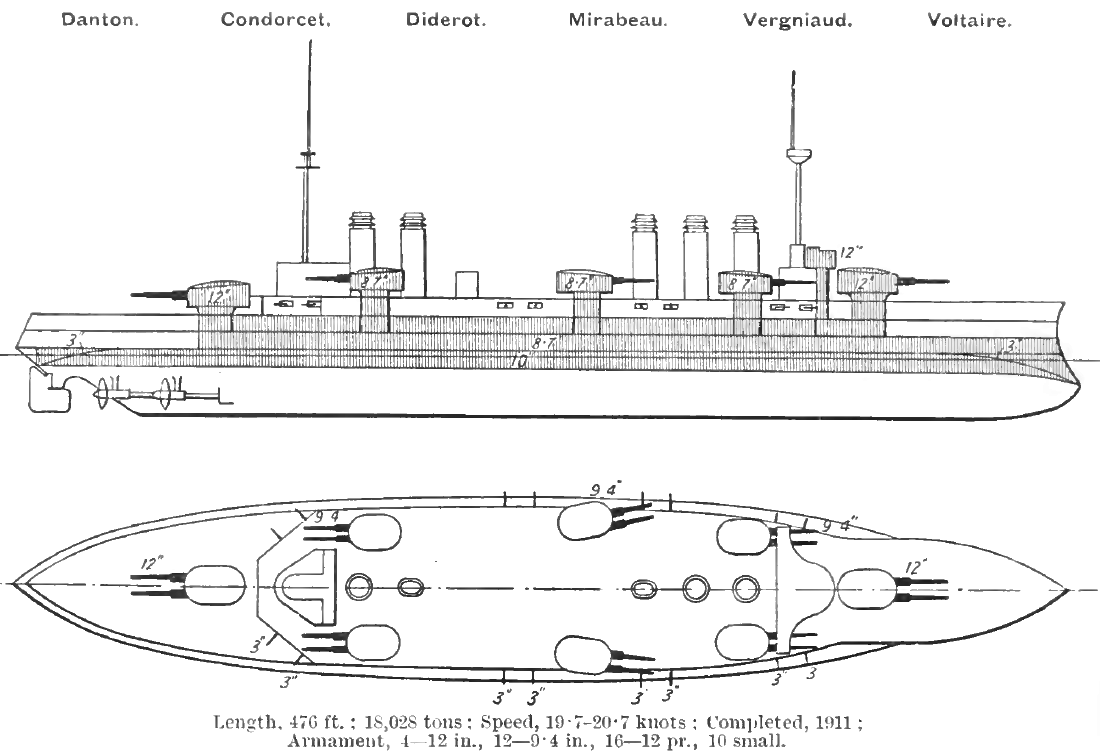
Right elevation and plan of the Dantons from Brassey's Naval Annual 1915

Although the Danton-class battleships were a significant improvement from the preceding Liberté class, they were outclassed by the advent of the dreadnought well before they were completed. Mirabeau was 146.6 meters (481 ft) long overall and had a beam of 25.8 meters (84 ft 8 in) and a deep-load draft of 8.44 meters (27 ft 8 in). She displaced 18,754 metric tons (18,458 long tons) at normal load and had a crew of 25 officers and 831 enlisted men. While serving as a flagship, her crew numbered 31 officers and 886 enlisted men. The ship was powered by four Parsons steam turbines, each driving one propeller shaft using steam generated by twenty-six Belleville boilers. The turbines were rated at 22,500 shaft horsepower (16,800 kW) and were designed to provide a top speed of 19.25 knots (35.65 km/h; 22.15 mph). Mirabeau slightly exceeded this figure when she reached a top speed of 19.7 knots (36.5 km/h; 22.7 mph) on her sea trials. The ship carried enough coal to give her a range of 3,500 nautical miles (6,500 km; 4,000 mi) at a speed of 10 knots (19 km/h; 12 mph).

The main battery of the Dantons consisted of four Canon de 305 mm (12 in) modèle 1906 mounted in two twin gun turrets, one forward and one aft of the superstructure. Their secondary armament consisted of a dozen Canon de 240 mm (9.4 in) modèle 1902 guns in twin turrets, three on each side of the ship. A number of smaller guns were carried for defense against torpedo boats. These included sixteen Canon de 75 mm (3 in) modèle 1908 guns in casemates in the sides of the hull and ten 47-millimeter (1.9 in) Hotchkiss guns mounted on the superstructure. She was also armed with two submerged 450-millimeter (17.7 in) torpedo tubes, one on each broadside. The ship's waterline armor belt ranged in thickness from 180 to 250 millimeters (7.1 to 9.8 in) and the main gun turrets were protected by armor 260–340 millimeters (10.2–13.4 in) thick. The sides of the conning tower consisted of 266-millimeter (10.5 in) armor plates.

=== Wartime modifications ===
The four aft 75-millimeter gun positions were very prone to flooding in anything other than calm weather and were removed from the Dantons in 1915–1917; their embrasures were plated over to stop the flooding. The four 47-millimeter guns on the aft superstructure were transferred to other ships at some point during the war. Those on the forward superstructure received high-angle mounts and were repositioned to better serve as anti-aircraft guns.

== Construction and career ==
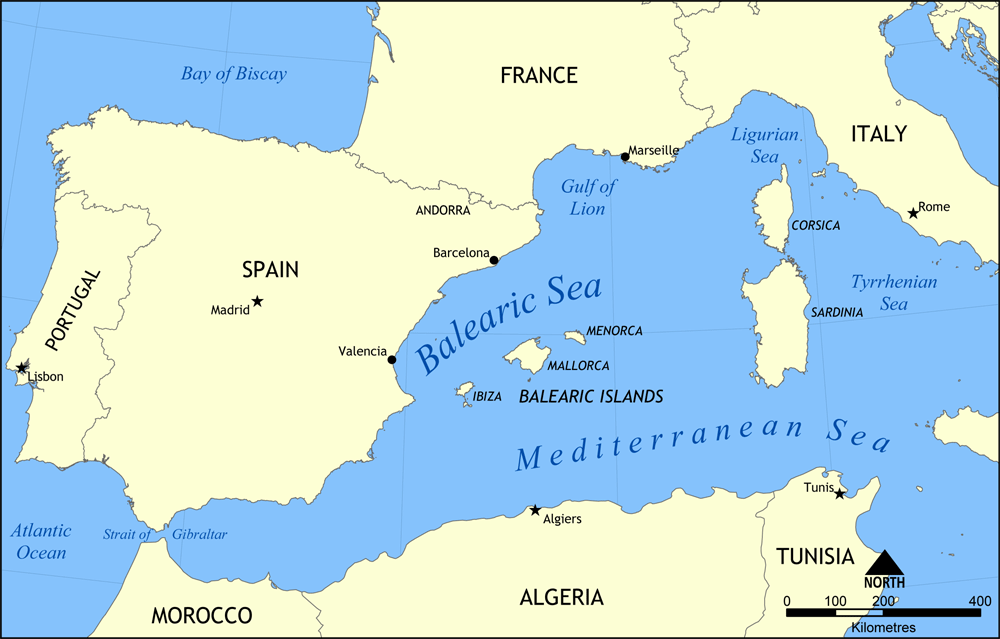
Map of the western Mediterranean, where Mirabeau spent the majority of her peacetime career

Ordered as part of the second tranche of the 1900 naval law that authorized a total of 19 battleships by 1919, Mirabeau was named after Honoré Riqueti, comte de Mirabeau, an early leader of the French Revolution. Construction of the ship began on 8 May 1906 at the Arsenal de Lorient and she was laid down on 4 May 1908. Mirabeau was launched on 28 October 1909 and was completed (armement définitif) on 1 August 1911. Upon reaching Toulon on 15 August, the ship became the flagship of Rear Admiral (Contre amiral) Dominique-Marie Gauchet, commander of the Mediterranean Squadron (Escadre de la Méditerranée's) Second Division (2^{e} Division de cuirasée) of the First Battle Squadron (1^{re} Escadre de ligne). Together with four of her sisters, she participated in a large naval review by the President of France, Armand Fallières, off Cap Brun on 4 September and then the visit by the Navy Minister, Théophile Delcassé on the 8th.

In mid-April 1912, the First Battle Squadron hosted three British armored cruisers at Golfe-Juan as their commander, Rear-Admiral Edward Gamble unveiled monuments to King Edward VII and his mother, Queen Victoria, at Cannes. Mirabeau participated in the July maneuvers in the Western Mediterranean and the exercise simulating a blockade of Ajaccio, Corsica, in November. On 3 March 1913 the First Battle Squadron conducted gunnery training off the Îles d'Hyères with the First Lord of the Admiralty, Winston Churchill, observing. The ship participated in combined fleet maneuvers between Provence and French Tunisia in May–June and the subsequent naval review conducted by the President of the Council, Raymond Poincaré, on 7 June. Rear Admiral Marie-Jean-Lucien Lacaze relieved Gauchet on 16 August and Mirabeau joined her squadron in its tour of the Eastern Mediterranean in October–December, making port visits in Egypt, Syria, and Greece.

Lacaze shifted his flag to her sister Voltaire on 12 March 1914 and the ship had to briefly withdraw from the grand fleet exercises on 13 May due to engine troubles. As tensions rose during the July Crisis, Mirabeau and the other ships of the First Battle Squadron downloaded their practice ammunition and exchanged suspect lots of propellant for new ones beginning on 27 July. They recoaled four days later and the Marine Nationale mobilized on 2 August.

=== World War I ===
Before the French declared war on the German Empire on the morning of 4 August, Vice Admiral (Vice-amiral) Augustin Boué de Lapeyrère, commander of the 1st Naval Army (1^{re} Armée Navale), as the Mediterranean Squadron had been renamed in 1913, ordered most of his ships to concentrate off the Algerian coast to escort troop convoys to Metropolitan France and to blockade German shipping in the Mediterranean. Despite this deployment the German battlecruiser SMS Goeben and light cruiser SMS Breslau were able to bombard Bône and Philippeville on 4 August. Despite Mirabeau's machinery problems which limited the 1st Battle Squadron to a speed of 15 knots (28 km/h; 17 mph), the squadron probably would have intercepted the German ships later that morning if its commander, Vice Admiral Paul Chocheprat, had not ordered a turn to the west. Mirabeau spent the rest of the month under repair. Aside from several uneventful sorties into the Adriatic, the French capital ships spent most of their time cruising between the neutral Greek and Italian coasts to prevent the Austro-Hungarian fleet from attempting to break out of the Adriatic. The torpedoing of the dreadnought battleship Jean Bart on 21 December by the Austro-Hungarian submarine U-12 showed that the battleships were vulnerable to this threat, and they were withdrawn to spend the rest of the month further south at an anchorage in Navarino Bay.

On 11 January 1915, the French were alerted that the Austro-Hungarian fleet was going to sortie from its base at Pola, so the Naval Army sailed north to the Albanian coast. It proved to be a false alarm, and they were back at their moorings three days later. In the meantime, the ships patrolled the Ionian Sea. The declaration of war on Austria-Hungary by Italy on 23 May, and the Italian decision to assume responsibility for naval operations in the Adriatic, allowed the French Navy to withdraw to either Malta or Bizerte, Tunisia, to cover the Otranto Barrage. Mirabeau was in Malta on 30 June when a torpedo exploded in a nearby warehouse. The ship was only lightly damaged, but two men of her crew were killed and eleven wounded.

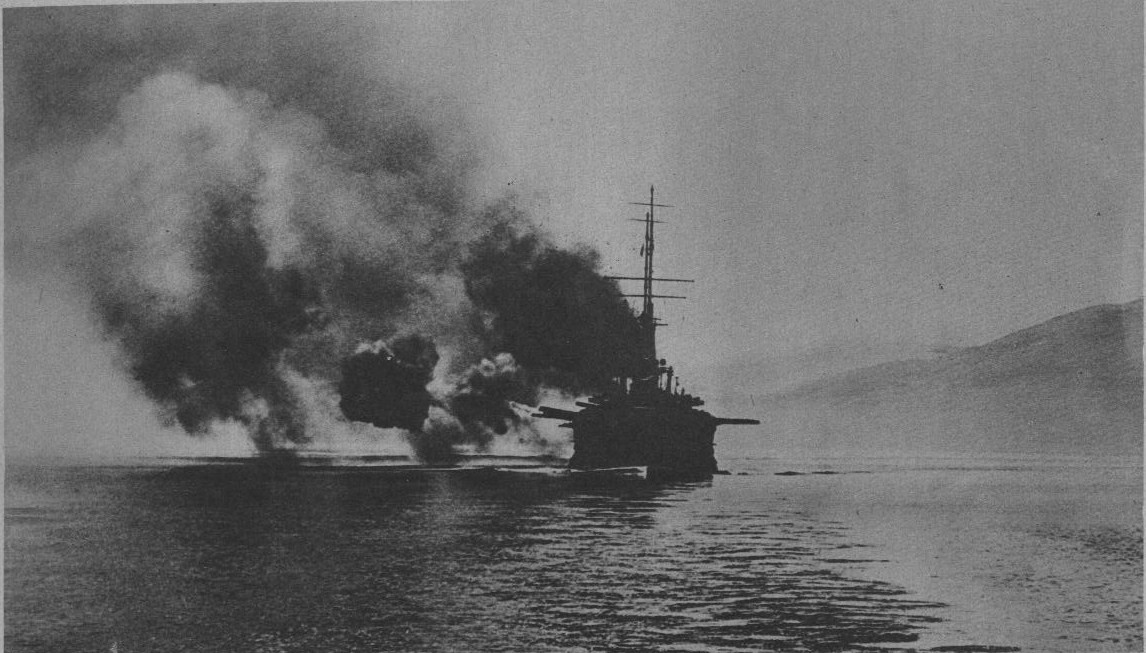
Mirabeau bombarding Athens, 1 December 1916

In November 1916, she transported landing parties from the other ships of her division to Athens. On 1 December, those landing parties participated in the Allied attempt to ensure Greek acquiescence to Allied operations in Macedonia. Greek resistance to the Allied action ended after Mirabeau fired four rounds from her main armament into the city, one of which landed near the Royal Palace. Afterwards, she spent 1917 based at Corfu or at Mudros to prevent Goeben, by this time transferred to the Ottoman Empire and renamed Yavuz Sultan Selim, from breaking out into the Mediterranean. In August the ship tested a tethered balloon, but it was destroyed by a lightning strike on 31 October. In April 1918, Mirabeau accompanied her sisters Diderot and Vergniaud to Mudros, where they remained for the rest of the war. The 1st Naval Army was reorganized on 1 July and most of the Danton-class ships were assigned to the Second Squadron (2^{e} Escadre) with Mirabeau part of the First Division of the squadron.

=== Postwar ===
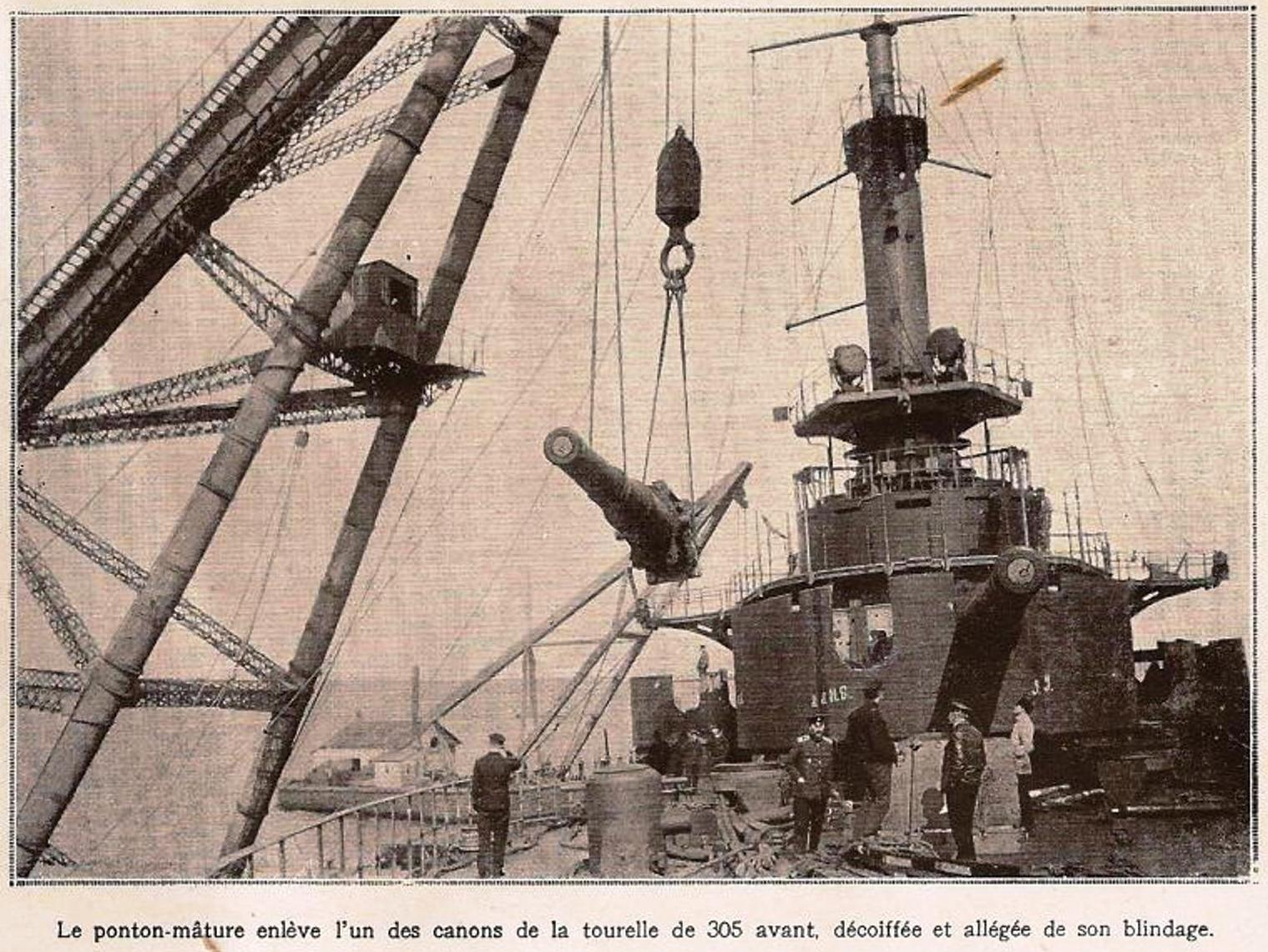
One of the ship's main guns being reinstalled in Sevastopol in 1919

After the Armistice of Mudros was signed on 30 October between the Allies and the Ottoman Empire, the ship participated in the early stage of the occupation of Constantinople beginning on 12 November. By 8 December Mirabeau was already deployed to the Black Sea to support White Russian forces in Sevastopol and deter Soviet forces who were advancing on the city during the Russian Civil War. Mirabeau ran aground during a snowstorm on 18 February 1919 off the Crimean coast. She could not be refloated until 6,000 metric tons (5,900 long tons) of weight were removed. To this end, her guns, turret armour, most of her boilers, coal, ammunition and the upper strake of belt armor was disembarked. After several weeks of effort, the ship was refloated on 6 April and she was towed by the Kagul and the tugboat Thernomore to a drydock in Sevastopol to repair any damage and to have her equipment reinstalled. This process began on 12 April, but Mirabeau was refloated three days later as news was received of the Red Army's advance on the city. Only her guns, ammunition and part of her armor had been replaced by the time the city was evacuated by the Allies on 5 May. She was towed to Constantinople by the battleship Justice and five tugs where she remained from 7–15 May. Justice then resumed the tow and they reached Toulon on the 24th. After an inspection of the ship in a drydock, Mirabeau was stricken on 22 August and turned over as compensation to the company that salvaged the pre-dreadnought battleship Liberté. Her hulk was towed to Savona, Italy, to be scrapped on 28 April 1922.

== Bibliography ==
- Caresse, Philippe (2012). "The Battleship Gaulois". In Jordan, John (ed.). Warship 2012. London: Conway. ISBN 978-1-84486-156-9.
- Gardiner, Robert & Gray, Randal, eds. (1985). Conway's All the World's Fighting Ships 1906–1921. Annapolis, Maryland: Naval Institute Press. ISBN 0-85177-245-5.
- Gille, Eric (1999). Cent ans de cuirassés français [A Century of French Battleships] (in French). Nantes: Marines édition. ISBN 2-909-675-50-5.
- Halpern, Paul G. (2004). The Battle of the Otranto Straits: Controlling the Gateway to the Adriatic in World War I. Bloomington, Indiana: Indiana University Press. ISBN 0-253-34379-8.
- Jordan, John & Caresse, Philippe (2017). French Battleships of World War One. Annapolis, Maryland: Naval Institute Press. ISBN 978-1-59114-639-1.
- Meirat, Jean (1968). "French Battleships Vergniaud and Condorcet". La Revue Maritime (261, 263, 265). Paris: Institut Français de la Mer. OCLC 41554533 – via F. P. D. S. Newsletter, VI:1, pp. 5–6, 1978.
- Silverstone, Paul H. (1984). Directory of the World's Capital Ships. New York: Hippocrene Books. ISBN 0-88254-979-0.
