= French battleship Voltaire =

French Danton-class semi-dreadnoughts

Coordinates: 47°26′N 2°44′W

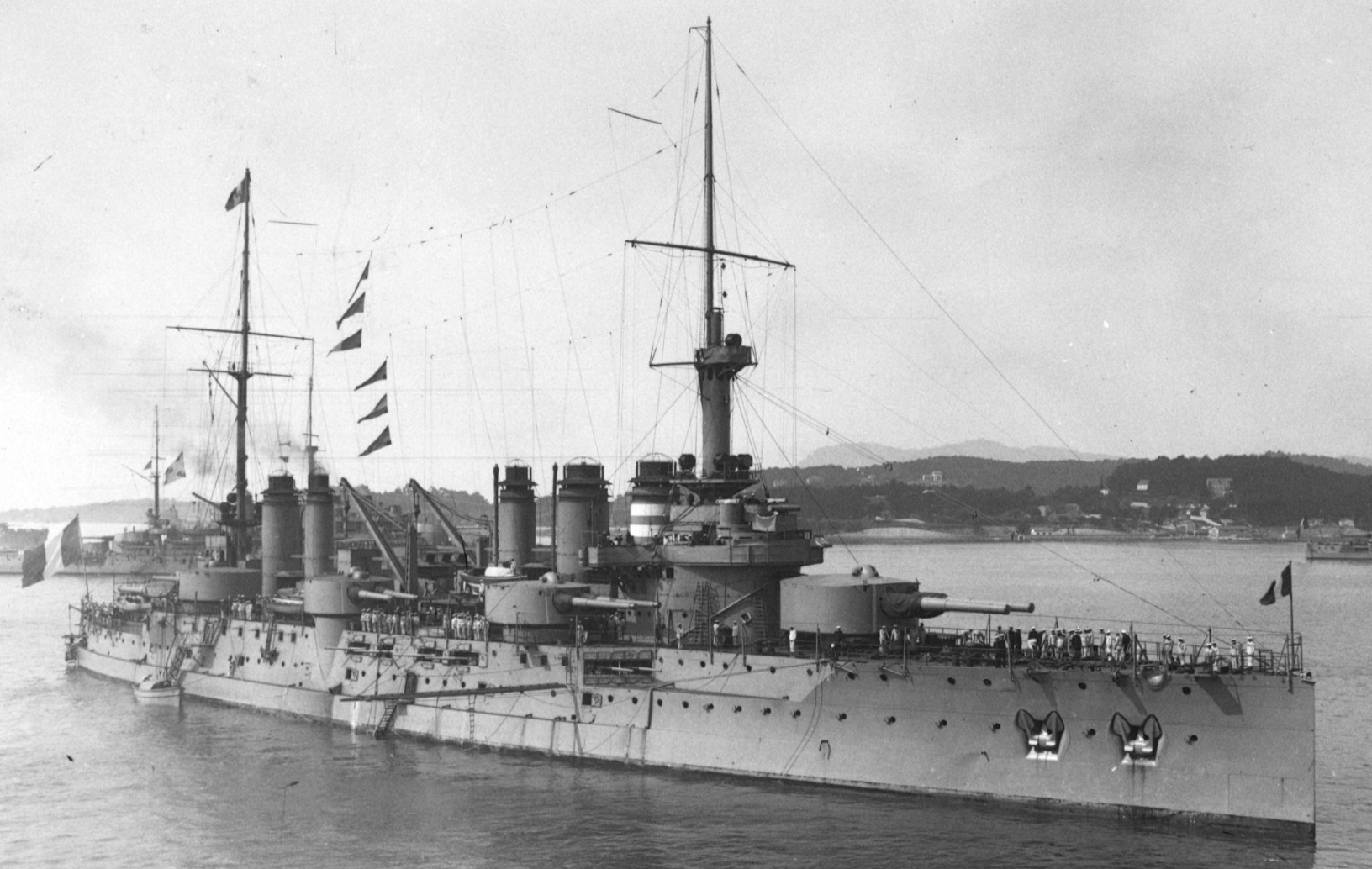
- Voltaire in Toulon harbour

History

France
- Name: Voltaire
- Namesake: Voltaire
- Builder: FC de la Méditerranée, La Seyne-sur-Mer
- Laid down: 20 July 1907
- Launched: 16 January 1909
- Completed: 1 August 1911
- Reclassified: As training ship, 1927
- Stricken: 1935
- Fate: Sold for scrap, December 1949

General characteristics
- Class & type: Danton class
- Type: Semi-dreadnought battleship
- Displacement: 18,754 t (18,458 long tons) (normal)
- Length: 146.6 m (481 ft) (o/a)
- Beam: 25.8 m (84 ft 8 in)
- Draft: 8.44 m (27 ft 8 in)
- Installed power: 26 Belleville boilers; 22,500 PS (16,500 kW)
- Propulsion: 4 shafts; 4 steam turbines
- Speed: 19.25 knots (35.7 km/h; 22.2 mph)
- Complement: 25 officers and 831 enlisted men
- Armament: 2 × twin 305 mm (12 in) guns; 6 × twin 240 mm (9.4 in) guns; 16 × single 75 mm (3 in) guns; 10 × single 47 mm (1.9 in) guns; 2 × 450 mm (17.7 in) torpedo tubes
- Armor: Belt: 180–250 mm (7.1–9.8 in); Turrets: 260–340 mm (10.2–13.4 in); Conning tower: 266 mm (10.5 in)

Voltaire was one of the six Danton-class semi-dreadnought battleships built for the French Navy in the first decade of the 20th century. Shortly after World War I began, the ship participated in the Battle of Antivari in the Adriatic Sea and helped to sink the Austro-Hungarian protected cruiser SMS Zenta. She spent most of the rest of the war blockading the Straits of Otranto and the Dardanelles to prevent German, Austro-Hungarian and Turkish warships from breaking out into the Mediterranean. Voltaire was hit by two torpedoes fired by a German submarine in October 1918, but was not seriously damaged. After the war, she was modernized in 1923–1925 and subsequently became a training ship. She was condemned in 1935 and later sold for scrap.

== Design and description ==
Although the Danton-class battleships were a significant improvement from the preceding Liberté class, they were outclassed by the advent of the dreadnought well before they were completed. They were not well liked by the navy, although their numerous rapid-firing guns were of some use in the Mediterranean.

Voltaire was 146.6 meters (481 ft 0 in) long overall and had a beam of 25.8 meters (84 ft 8 in) and a full-load draft of 9.2 meters (30 ft 2 in). She displaced 19,736 metric tons (19,424 long tons) at deep load and had a crew of 681 officers and enlisted men. The ship was powered by four Parsons steam turbines using steam generated by twenty-six Belleville boilers. The turbines were rated at 22,500 shaft horsepower (16,800 kW) and provided a top speed of around 19 knots (35 km/h; 22 mph). Voltaire, however, reached a top speed of 20.7 knots (38.3 km/h; 23.8 mph) during her sea trials. She carried a maximum of 2,027 tonnes (1,995 long tons) of coal which allowed her to steam for 3,370 nautical miles (6,240 km; 3,880 mi) at a speed of 10 knots (19 km/h; 12 mph).

Voltaire's main battery consisted of four 305mm/45 Modèle 1906 guns mounted in two twin gun turrets, one forward and one aft. The secondary battery consisted of twelve 240mm/50 Modèle 1902 guns in twin turrets, three on each side of the ship. A number of smaller guns were carried for defense against torpedo boats. These included sixteen 75 mm (3.0 in) L/65 guns and ten 47-millimetre (1.9 in) Hotchkiss guns. The ship was also armed with two submerged 450 mm (17.7 in) torpedo tubes. The ship's waterline armor belt was 270 mm (10.6 in) thick and the main battery was protected by up to 300 mm (11.8 in) of armor. The conning tower also had 300 mm thick sides.

=== Wartime modifications ===
During the war 75 mm anti-aircraft guns were installed on the roofs of the ship's two forward 240 mm gun turrets. During 1918, the mainmast was shortened to allow the ship to fly a captive kite balloon and the elevation of the 240 mm guns was increased which extended their range to 18,000 meters (20,000 yd).

== Career ==
Construction of Voltaire was begun on 26 December 1906 by Forges et Chantiers de la Méditerranée in La Seyne-sur-Mer and the ship was laid down on 20 July 1907. She was launched on 16 January 1909 and was completed on 5 August 1911. The ship was assigned to the Second Division of the 1st Squadron (escadre) of the Mediterranean Fleet when she was commissioned. The ship participated in combined fleet maneuvers between Provence and Tunisia in May–June 1913 and the subsequent naval review conducted by the President of France, Raymond Poincaré on 7 June 1913. Afterwards, Voltaire joined her squadron in its tour of the Eastern Mediterranean in October–December 1913 and participated in the grand fleet exercise in the Mediterranean in May 1914.

=== World War I ===
In early August 1914, the ship cruised the Strait of Sicily in an attempt to prevent the German battlecruiser Goeben and the light cruiser Breslau from breaking out to the West. On 16 August 1914 the combined Anglo-French Fleet under Admiral Auguste Boué de Lapeyrère, including Voltaire, made a sweep of the Adriatic Sea. The Allied ships encountered the Austro-Hungarian cruiser SMS Zenta, escorted by the destroyer SMS Ulan, blockading the coast of Montenegro. There were too many ships for Zenta to escape, so she remained behind to allow Ulan to get away and was sunk by gunfire during the Battle of Antivari off the coast of Bar, Montenegro. Voltaire subsequently participated in a number of raids into the Adriatic later in the year and patrolled the Ionian Islands. From December 1914 to 1916, the ship participated in the distant blockade of the Straits of Otranto while based in Corfu. On 1 December 1916, some of her sailors, transported to Athens by her sister Mirabeau, participated in the Allied attempt to ensure Greek acquiescence to Allied operations in Macedonia. Voltaire spent part of 1917 through April 1918 based at Mudros to prevent Goeben from breaking out into the Mediterranean.

The ship was overhauled from May to October 1918 in Toulon. While returning to Mudros on 10 October, the ship was torpedoed by UB-48 off the island of Milos. Despite being struck by two torpedoes, she able to make temporary repairs at Milos before sailing to Bizerte for permanent repairs. Voltaire was based in Toulon throughout 1919 and was modernized in 1922–25 to improve her underwater protection. The ship became a training ship in 1927 and was condemned in on 17 March 1937. She was scuttled in Quiberon Bay (France) on 31 May 1938 for long-term use as a target; the wreck was sold in December 1949 and broken up from March 1950 onwards.

== Bibliography ==
- Dumas, Robert & Prévoteaux, Gérard (2011). Les Cuirassés de 18 000t. Outreau: Lela Presse. ISBN 978-2-914017-62-6.
- Gardiner, Robert & Gray, Randal, eds. (1985). Conway's All the World's Fighting Ships 1906–1921. Annapolis, Maryland: Naval Institute Press. ISBN 0-85177-245-5.
- Gille, Eric (1999). Cent ans de cuirassés français [A Century of French Battleships] (in French). Nantes: Marines édition. ISBN 2-909-675-50-5.
- Halpern, Paul G. (2004). The Battle of the Otranto Straits: Controlling the Gateway to the Adriatic in World War I. Bloomington, Indiana: Indiana University Press. ISBN 978-0-253-34379-6.
- Jordan, John & Caresse, Philippe (2017). French Battleships of World War One. Annapolis, Maryland: Naval Institute Press. ISBN 978-1-59114-639-1.
- Meirat, Jean (1978). "French Battleships Vernigaud and Condorcet". F. P. D. S. Newsletter. VI (1). Akron, Ohio: F. P. D. S.: 5–6. OCLC 41554533.
