= Danton-class battleship =

French semi-dreadnought battleship class

Coordinates: 38°45′21″N 8°03′18″E

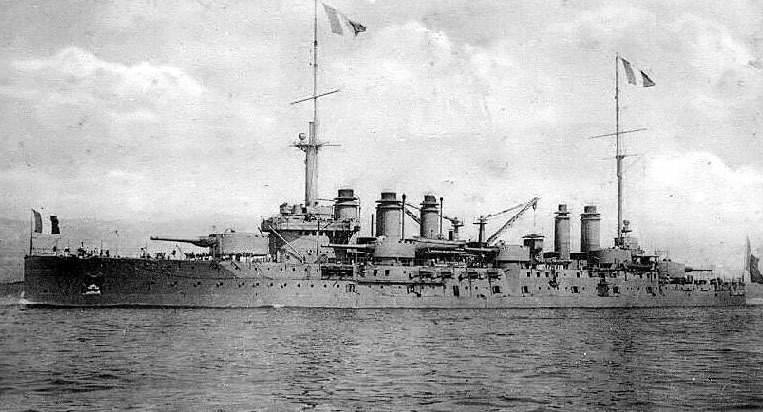
- Postcard of Vergniaud

Class overview
- Name: Danton-class battleship
- Builders: Ateliers et Chantiers de la Loire (2); Arsenal de Brest (1); Arsenal de Lorient (1); Forges et Chantiers de la Méditerranée (1); Forges et Chantiers de la Gironde (1)
- Operators: French Navy
- Preceded by: Liberté class
- Succeeded by: Courbet class
- Built: 1907–1911
- In commission: 1911–1937
- Completed: 6
- Lost: 1
- Scrapped: 5

General characteristics (as completed)
- Type: Semi-dreadnought battleship
- Displacement: 18,754 t (18,458 long tons) (normal)
- Length: 146.6 m (481 ft) (o/a)
- Beam: 25.8 m (84 ft 8 in)
- Draft: 8.44 m (27 ft 8 in)
- Installed power: 26 Belleville boilers; 22,500 PS (16,500 kW)
- Propulsion: 4 shafts; 4 steam turbines
- Speed: 19.25 knots (35.7 km/h; 22.2 mph)
- Complement: 25 officers and 831 enlisted men
- Armament: 2 × twin 305 mm (12 in) guns; 6 × twin 240 mm (9.4 in) guns; 16 × single 75 mm (3 in) guns; 8 × single 47 mm (1.9 in) guns; 2 × 450 mm (17.7 in) torpedo tubes
- Armor: Belt: 180–250 mm (7.1–9.8 in); Turrets: 260–340 mm (10.2–13.4 in); Conning tower: 266 mm (10.5 in)

The Danton-class battleship was a class of six semi-dreadnought battleships built for the French Navy (Marine Nationale) before World War I. The ships were assigned to the Mediterranean Fleet after commissioning in 1911. After the beginning of World War I in early August 1914, five of the sister ships participated in the Battle of Antivari. They spent most of the rest of the war blockading the Straits of Otranto and the Dardanelles to prevent warships of the Central Powers from breaking out into the Mediterranean. One ship was sunk by a German submarine in 1917.

The remaining five ships were obsolescent by the end of the war and most were assigned to secondary roles. Two of the sisters were sent to the Black Sea to support the Whites during the Russian Civil War. One ship ran aground and the crew of the other mutinied after one of its members was killed during a protest against intervention in support of the Whites. Both ships were quickly condemned and later sold for scrap. The remaining three sisters received partial modernizations in the mid-1920s and became training ships until they were condemned in the mid-1930s and later scrapped. The only survivor still afloat at the beginning of World War II in August 1939 had been hulked in 1931 and was serving as part of the navy's torpedo school. She was captured by the Germans when they occupied Vichy France in 1942 and scuttled by them after the Allied invasion of southern France in 1944.

== Background and description ==
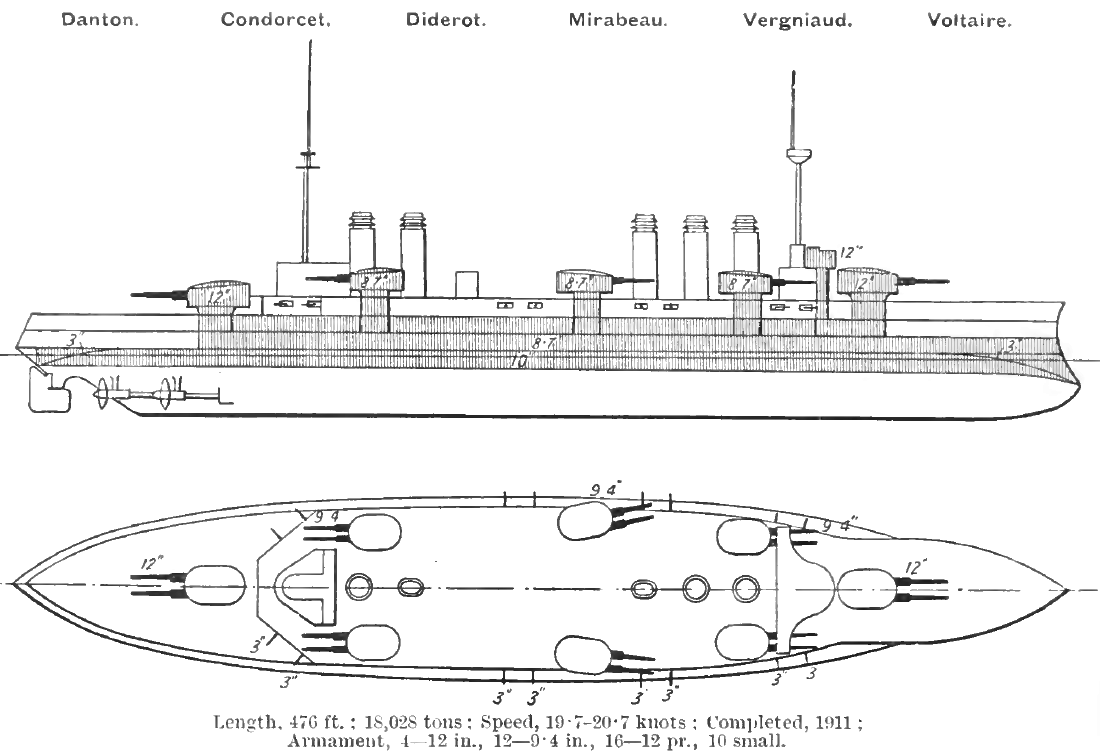
Right elevation and plan of the Dantons as depicted by Brassey's Naval Annual 1915. The shaded areas represent the armor protection. The drawing incorrectly shows the ships with a ram bow; they actually had a straight stem.

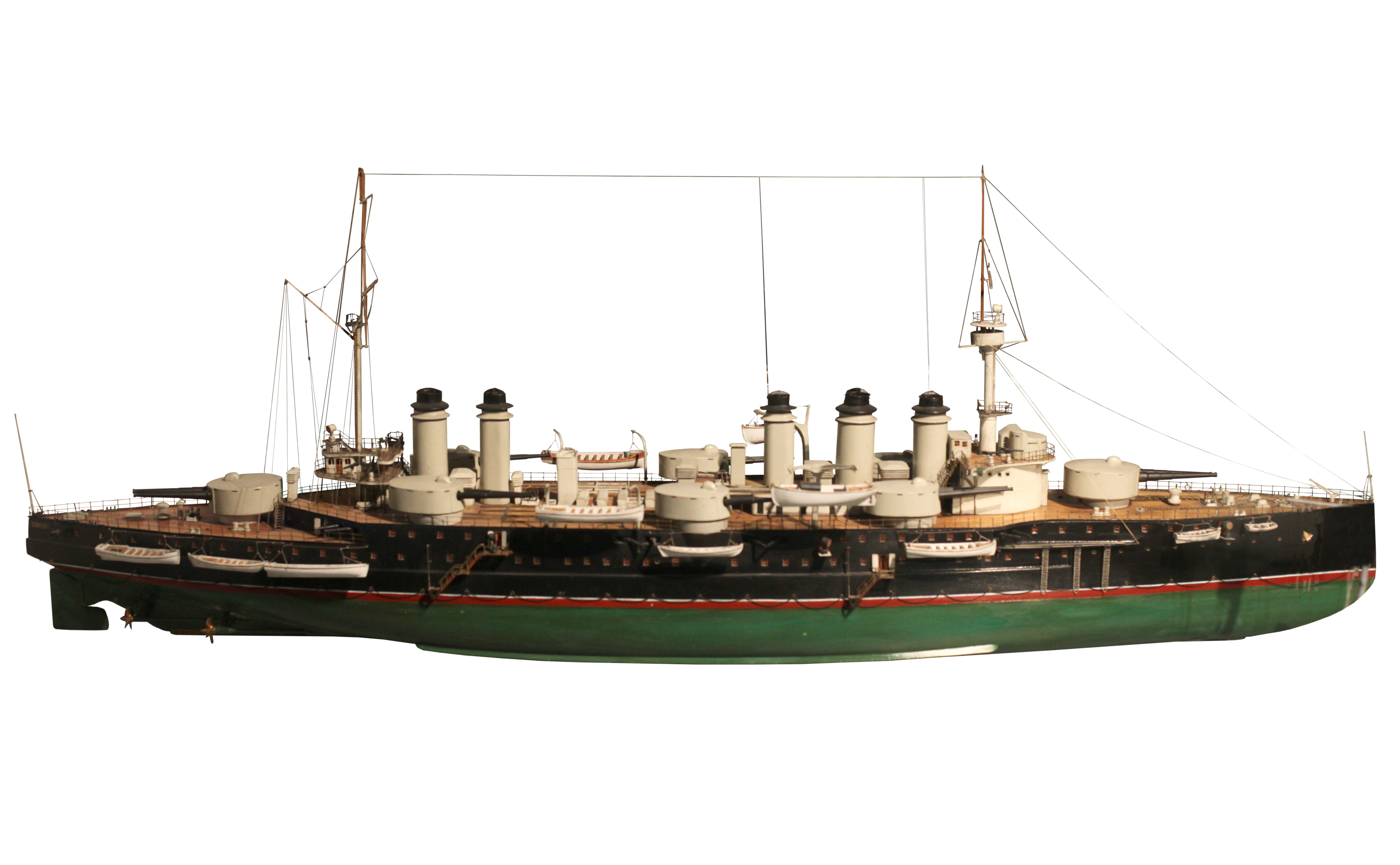
Arsenal model of Danton, on display at the Musée national de la Marine in Paris.

The Danton-class ships were ordered as the second tranche of a French naval expansion plan that began in response to the growth of the Imperial German Navy after 1900. Discussions began in 1905 for an enlarged version of the preceding Liberté-class design. French analyses of the Russian defeat by the Japanese at the Battle of Tsushima in May 1905 credited the latter's victory to the large number of medium-caliber hits that heavily damaged the superstructures of the Russian ships and started many fires that the crews had difficulty extinguishing. The superior speed and handling of the Japanese ships was also credited with a role in their victory.

The French decided that the increasing range of naval combat dictated the use of the 240-millimeter (9.4 in) gun in lieu of the 194-millimeter (7.6 in) gun used on the Liberté class as the larger gun had a greater ability to penetrate armor at longer ranges while still having a good rate of fire. The navy also wanted a faster ship, but this could only be done by reducing armor thicknesses without exceeding the 18,000-metric-ton (18,000-long-ton) limit imposed by the Minister of the Navy, Gaston Thomson, for budgetary reasons. A preliminary design with the usual triple-expansion steam engines was accepted in March 1906, but various modifications were requested. One proposal was made to replace the 240-millimeter guns turrets with single 305-millimeter (12 in) turrets to create an "all-big-gun" ship, like the British battleship HMS Dreadnought, but this was rejected as it would have raised the displacement above the 18,000-metric ton limit and the slower-firing 305-millimeter guns would have reduced the volume and weight of fire to an unacceptable degree.

Initial parliamentary discussion of the design focused less on the anticipated cost of the ships than the idea that France was being left behind in the technological arms race, particularly in regard to the innovative Parsons steam turbines used by HMS Dreadnought. In response the navy sent a technical mission to inspect the Parsons factory, several shipyards, and gun factories as well as the Barr & Stroud rangefinder factory in May 1906 and concluded that the turbines offered more power in a smaller volume than triple-expansion steam engines at a significant increase in fuel consumption at low speeds. Two ships had already been ordered from the naval dockyards three months previously when the navy decided to use the turbines in July. To further complicate things, Thomson requested a study using the heavier and more powerful 45-caliber 305-millimeter Modèle 1906 gun on 3 August while not endorsing the navy's decision to use turbines. On 6 October the director of naval construction, M. Dudebout, urgently requested a decision while recommending that three ships use triple-expansion steam engines and the other three use steam turbines. He felt that this would minimize delays and expense as the design needed to be modified to accommodate the turbines and their four propeller shafts, no company in France knew how to build the turbines, and the latter were three times as expensive as steam engines. Thomson was inclined to accept Dudebout's recommendation, but prevaricated until December, after parliamentary debates showed overwhelming support for turbines in all six ships. Contracts for the remaining four ships were signed on 26 December, the day after the conclusion of the debate. Thomson also delayed in deciding on which boilers to use. He sent another technical mission to Britain to look at Babcock & Wilcox's design in April 1907, but did not make a decision in favor of French-built boilers until 3 June 1908, after all the ships had been laid down.

The design was estimated to displace 18,318 tonnes (18,029 long tons) before the adoption of the heavier Modèle 1906 gun required a new and larger turret to handle the gun which meant that the turret's supporting structure also had to be reinforced. In an unsuccessful bid to reduce the displacement, many sections of armor were reduced in thickness, but the ships exceeded even the design estimate as built.

== General description ==
The Dantons were significantly larger than their predecessors of the Liberté class. The ships were 145 meters (475 ft 9 in) long at the waterline and 146.6 meters (481 ft 0 in) long overall, over 13 meters (42 ft 8 in) longer than the earlier ships. They had a beam of 25.8 meters (84 ft 8 in) and a draft of 8.44 meters (27 ft 8 in) at deep load. The Danton-class ships were slightly overweight; they actually displaced 18,754 metric tons (18,458 long tons) at normal load. This was over 4,000 tonnes (3,900 long tons) more than the earlier ships. When serving as flagships, their crew consisted of 40 officers and 875 enlisted men. Without an admiral and his staff embarked, the crew numbered 28 officers and 824 enlisted men.

=== Propulsion ===
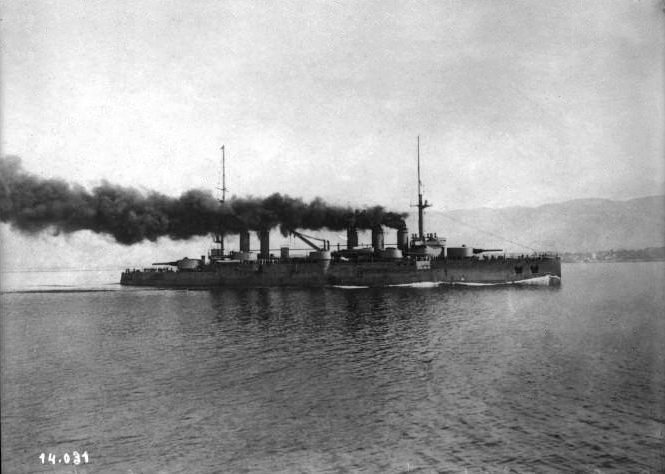
Voltaire underway in Toulon harbor, 8 May 1911

The Danton-class ships had four license-built Parsons direct-drive steam turbines, each of which drove a single propeller, using steam from 26 coal-fired Belleville or Niclausse boilers. Each boiler type was installed on three ships of the class. The boilers were housed in two large compartments, 17 in the forward boiler room that used the three forward funnels and 9 in the aft boiler which exhausted through the rear pair of funnels. The turbines were amidships, between the boiler rooms, in three compartments. The center engine room housed the turbines for the two center propeller shafts and the turbine for each of the outer shafts had their own compartment flanking the center engine room. The turbines were rated at a total of 22,500 shaft horsepower (16,800 kW) using steam provided by the boilers at a working pressure of 18 kg/cm^{2} (1,765 kPa; 256 psi). Designed for a maximum speed of 19.25 knots (35.65 km/h; 22.15 mph), they handily exceeded that during their sea trials with speeds ranging from 19.7 to 20.66 knots (36.5 to 38.3 km/h; 22.7 to 23.8 mph).

The Niclausse boilers were not well suited for use with turbines and burned more coal than the Belleville boilers. They also produced copious amounts of smoke and sparks; occasionally even flames from incomplete combustion of the coal. The Dantons carried a maximum of 2,027 tonnes (1,995 long tons) of coal which gave them an estimated range from 3,120–4,866 nautical miles (5,778–9,012 km; 3,590–5,600 mi) at a speed of 12 knots (22 km/h; 14 mph), depending on which boilers were fitted. Their endurance was almost half that of their predecessors due to the uneconomical fuel consumption of their turbines at low speeds and meant that they needed frequent coaling stops during the war.

=== Armament ===
The main battery of the Danton-class ships consisted of four 305 mm Modèle 1906 guns mounted in two twin-gun turrets, one each fore and aft of the superstructure. Each turret could elevate up to +12° that gave the guns a maximum range of 14,500 meters (15,900 yd). The guns fired 440-kilogram (970 lb) armor-piercing projectiles at a muzzle velocity of 780 m/s (2,600 ft/s) at a rate of 1.5 rounds per minute. Each turret stored eight rounds along the rear wall and their propellant was kept between the floor of the firing chamber and the bottom of the turret. The ships normally stowed 75 rounds per gun, but space was available for an additional 10 rounds. Their secondary armament consisted of twelve 240mm/50 Modèle 1902 guns in six twin-gun turrets, three on each side of the ship. Maximum elevation of the turrets was +13° and the 240-kilogram (530 lb) shell could be fired to a range of 14,000 meters (15,000 yd). The guns could fire at a rate of two rounds per minute. Each turret had space for 12 shells and the necessary 36 propellant charges; 80 rounds per gun was normally carried, but maximum capacity was 100 rounds per gun.

The Dantons carried a number of smaller guns to defend themselves against torpedo boats. These included sixteen 75-millimeter (3.0 in) Modèle 1908 Schneider guns mounted in unarmored embrasures in the hull sides. These guns had a range of 8,000 meters (8,700 yd) and could fire approximately 15 rounds per minute. Because the shell hoists were slow and the shells difficult to handle in their three-round cases in the magazines, a total of 576 rounds were stored close to the guns in ready-use lockers. Each gun was provided with 400 rounds, but the maximum storage available was 430 rounds per gun. The ships also mounted ten 47-millimeter (1.9 in) Hotchkiss guns in pivot mounts on the superstructure. They had the same rate of fire as the larger 75 mm guns, but only a range of 6,000 meters (6,600 yd). Each gun had 36 rounds nearby in ready-use lockers and the ships were provided with a maximum of 800 rounds per gun.

The battleships were also armed with two submerged 450-millimeter (17.7 in) torpedo tubes, one on each broadside. Each tube was angled 10° forward and 3° downward. Each ship carried six Modèle 1909R torpedoes. They had a 114-kilogram (251 lb) warhead and two speed/range settings: 3,000 meters (3,300 yd) at 28 knots (52 km/h; 32 mph) or 2,000 meters (2,200 yd) at 33 knots (61 km/h; 38 mph). The Dantons also had storage space for 10 Harlé Modèle 1906 mines, which had an explosive charge of 60 kilograms (130 lb) of guncotton. These could not be laid by the ships themselves, but had to be off-loaded for use.

=== Fire control ===
Finding the British Barr & Stroud coincidence rangefinder design superior to existing French designs, the Dantons mounted a pair of 2-meter (6 ft 7 in) FQ rangefinders atop the conning tower and a 1.37-meter (4 ft 6 in) rangefinder on each turret top for use by the turret commanders. Integrating these into the overall fire-control system took some time, so eight Ponthus & Therrode stadimeters, which required knowledge of the target's mast height and overall length, were used in the interim. During the war, the rangefinders were replaced by longer, more precise instruments. A triple 4.57-meter (15 ft 0 in) model was installed above the conning tower and 2-meter models replaced the smaller ones on the turret roofs.

=== Armor ===
The Danton-class ships were built with 6,725 metric tons (6,619 long tons) of armor, 36 percent of their designed displacement and almost 1,200 metric tons (1,200 long tons) more than their predecessors. Their waterline armored belt had a maximum thickness of 250 millimeters (9.8 in) between the fore and aft turrets that reduced to 180 millimeters (7.1 in) towards the bow and stern. The belt consisted of two strakes of armor, 4.5 meters (14 ft 9 in) high, that covered the sides of the hull up to the main deck and extended 1.1 m (3 ft 7 in) below the normal waterline. Most of the lower armor plates tapered to a thickness of 80–100 millimeters (3.1–3.9 in) along their bottom edge and the upper plates tapered to 220 millimeters (8.7 in) amidships and down to 140 millimeters (5.5 in) at the ends of the ship. The belt armour was backed by 80 millimeters (3.1 in) of teak. It extended almost the entire length of the ship, with only the very stern unprotected. At the stern, the belt terminated in a 200-millimeter (7.9 in) transverse bulkhead; the forward 154-millimeter (6.1 in) transverse bulkhead connected the sides of the forward barbette to the belt.

The main gun turrets had 340 millimeters (13.4 in) of armor on their faces, 260-millimeter (10 in) sides, and roofs of three layers of 24-millimeter (0.94 in) mild-steel plates. Their barbettes were protected by 246 millimeters (9.7 in) of armor which thinned to 66 millimeters (2.6 in) below the upper protected deck. The secondary gun turrets had 225-millimeter (8.9 in) faces, 188-millimeter (7.4 in) sides, and a roof of three layers of 17-millimeter (0.67 in) plates. The 240-millimeter turret barbettes had sides 154 to 148 millimeters (6.1 to 5.8 in). The front of the conning tower had armor 266 millimeters (10.5 in) thick and its sides were 216 millimeters (8.5 in). The walls of its communication tube down to the fire-control center (poste central de tir) were 200 millimeters thick down to the upper protected deck.

The ships had two protected decks (the pont blindé supérieur and the pont blindé inférieur (PBI)), each formed from triple layers of mild steel 15 millimeters (0.59 in) or 16 millimeters (0.63 in) thick. The lower of these, the PBI, curved downwards towards the sides of the hull to meet the torpedo bulkhead and the curved portion was reinforced by the substitution of a 40-millimeter (1.6 in) plate of armor in lieu of the uppermost 15-millimeter plate of mild steel. The PBI also sloped downward toward the bow and was similarly reinforced to form an armored glacis. The Dantons had an internal anti-torpedo bulge 2 meters (6 ft 7 in) deep along the side of the hull below the waterline. It was backed by a torpedo bulkhead that consisted of three layers of 15-millimeter armor plate. Inboard of the bulkhead were 16 watertight compartments, 12 of which were normally kept empty, but the 4 abreast the boiler rooms were used as coal bunkers. This system of protection had only mixed success in practice as Danton capsized in 40 minutes after two torpedo hits while Voltaire survived her two torpedoes.

== Ships ==
Ship	Namesake	Builder	Laid down	Launched	Entered service	Fate
Condorcet	Marquis de Condorcet	A. C. de la Loire, St Nazaire	23 August 1907	20 April 1909	25 July 1911	Sunk by aircraft, 7 March 1944; refloated September 1945; condemned 14 December 1945; broken up 1946–1949
Danton	Georges Danton	Arsenal de Brest, Brest	9 January 1908	4 July 1909	24 July 1911	Sunk by U-64, 19 March 1917
Diderot	Denis Diderot	A. C. de la Loire, St Nazaire	20 October 1907	19 April 1909	25 July 1911	Scrapped, 31 August 1937
Mirabeau	Comte de Mirabeau	Arsenal de Lorient, Lorient	4 May 1908	29 October 1909	1 August 1911	Condemned, 27 October 1921
Vergniaud	Pierre Vergniaud	A. C. de la Gironde, Bordeaux	July 1908	12 April 1910	18 December 1911	Sold for scrap, 27 November 1928
Voltaire	Voltaire	F. C. de la Méditerranée, La Seyne-sur-Mer	8 June 1907	16 January 1909	5 August 1911	Sunk as target 27 May 1938; scrapped from 1950

== Construction and careers ==
The Dantons took a long time to build. Construction was prolonged by a number of factors, chief of which were the 500 plus changes were made to the original design and in the inability of Thomson to make a timely decision. This meant that the builders sometimes had to rip out already completed sections to incorporate the modifications. Other problems were shortages of necessary infrastructure at the shipyards, lengthy delays in delivery of parts, and labor shortages and a lack of building slips in the naval dockyards. For example, water in the lower end of the newly completed Point-du-Jour slip at Brest meant that building Danton's stern was delayed four months after the bow began and construction of Mirabeau could not begin until the armored cruiser Waldeck-Rousseau was launched.

After commissioning in 1911, all six ships were assigned to the First Battle Squadron (Première escadre de ligne) of the Mediterranean Fleet where they participated in the fleet maneuvers in May–June 1913. When the war began, the squadron, under the command of Vice Admiral Paul Chocheprat, was at sea preparing to escort troop convoys from French North Africa to France. Some of the ships unsuccessfully searched for the German battlecruiser SMS Goeben and the light cruiser SMS Breslau in the Western Mediterranean and escorted convoys. Later that month, all of the ships, except Mirabeau, participated in the Battle of Antivari in the Adriatic Sea and helped to sink an Austro-Hungarian protected cruiser. They spent most of the rest of the war blockading the Straits of Otranto and the Dardanelles to prevent German, Austro-Hungarian and Turkish warships from breaking out. Mirabeau participated in the attempt to ensure Greek acquiescence to Allied operations in Macedonia in late 1916.

=== Post war ===
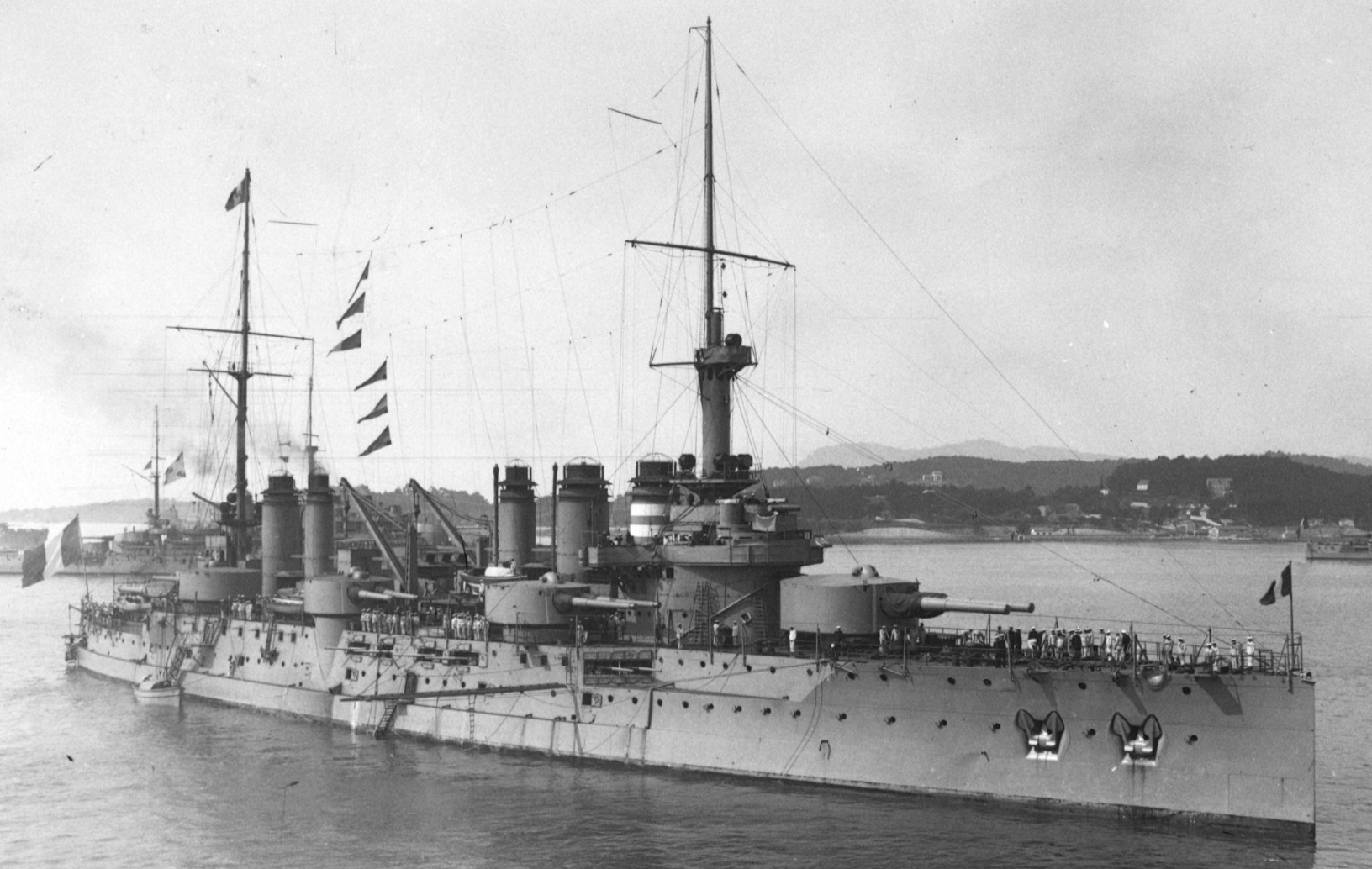
Voltaire at anchor

Diderot, Mirabeau and Vergniaud briefly participated in the occupation of Constantinople after the end of the war and the latter two ships were sent to the Black Sea in early 1919 during the Southern Russia Intervention. Vergniaud's crew mutinied after one of its members was killed when a protest against intervention in support of the Whites was bloodily suppressed and forced the return of the French ships supporting the Whites. Mirabeau ran aground in February 1919 off the coast of the Crimea and could not be refloated until some of her guns and armor were removed.

All of the surviving ships except Condorcet were reduced to second-line roles by 1920. Mirabeau was not repaired after her salvage and was hulked for a few years before being sold. Vergniaud was in bad shape and became a target ship before she was sold for scrap. Voltaire and Diderot had their underwater protection modernized in the early 1920s and became training ships before they were condemned in the mid-1930s. Condorcet was assigned to the Channel Division in the early 1920s before she too had her underwater protection modernized. She also became a training ship after its completion, but she was hulked in 1931 and became a depot ship for the torpedo school. The ship was captured intact when the Germans occupied Toulon in November 1942 and was used by them as a barracks ship. Condorcet was scuttled by the Germans in August 1944 and refloated the following year before being scrapped.

Danton's wreck was discovered in 2007 between Algeria and Sardinia at a depth of over 1,000 meters (3,300 ft).

== Bibliography ==
- Amos, Jonathan (19 February 2009). "Danton Wreck Found in Deep Water". BBC News.
- Chesneau, Roger & Kolesnik, Eugene M., eds. (1979). Conway's All the World's Fighting Ships 1860–1905. Greenwich, UK: Conway Maritime Press. ISBN 978-0-8317-0302-8.
- Corbett, Julian (March 1997). Naval Operations to the Battle of the Falklands. History of the Great War: Based on Official Documents. Vol. I (2nd, reprint of the 1938 ed.). London and Nashville, Tennessee: Imperial War Museum and Battery Press. ISBN 978-0-89839-256-2.
- Dumas, Robert & Prévoteaux, Gérard (2011). Les Cuirassés de 18 000t. Outreau: Lela Presse. ISBN 978-2-914017-62-6.
- Friedman, Norman (2011). Naval Weapons of World War One: Guns, Torpedoes, Mines and ASW Weapons of All Nations; An Illustrated Directory. Barnsley, UK: Seaforth Publishing. ISBN 978-1-84832-100-7.
- Gardiner, Robert & Gray, Randal, eds. (1985). Conway's All the World's Fighting Ships 1906–1921. Annapolis, Maryland: Naval Institute Press. ISBN 978-0-85177-245-5.
- Gille, Eric (1999). Cent ans de cuirassés français [A Century of French Battleships] (in French). Nantes: Marines. ISBN 2-909-675-50-5.
- Jordan, John (2013). "The 'Semi-Dreadnoughts' of the Danton Class". In Jordan, John (ed.). Warship 2013. London: Conway. pp. 46–66. ISBN 978-1-84486-205-4.
- Jordan, John & Caresse, Philippe (2017). French Battleships of World War One. Annapolis, Maryland: Naval Institute Press. ISBN 978-1-59114-639-1.
- Meirat, Jean (1978). "French Battleships Vergniaud and Condorcet". F. P. D. S. Newsletter. VI (1): 5–6. OCLC 41554533.
- Ropp, Theodore (1987). Roberts, Stephen S. (ed.). The Development of a Modern Navy: French Naval Policy, 1871–1904. Annapolis, Maryland: Naval Institute Press. ISBN 978-0-87021-141-6.
- Silverstone, Paul H. (1984). Directory of the World's Capital Ships. New York: Hippocrene Books. ISBN 0-88254-979-0.
