= French battleship Danton =

French lead ship of Danton-class

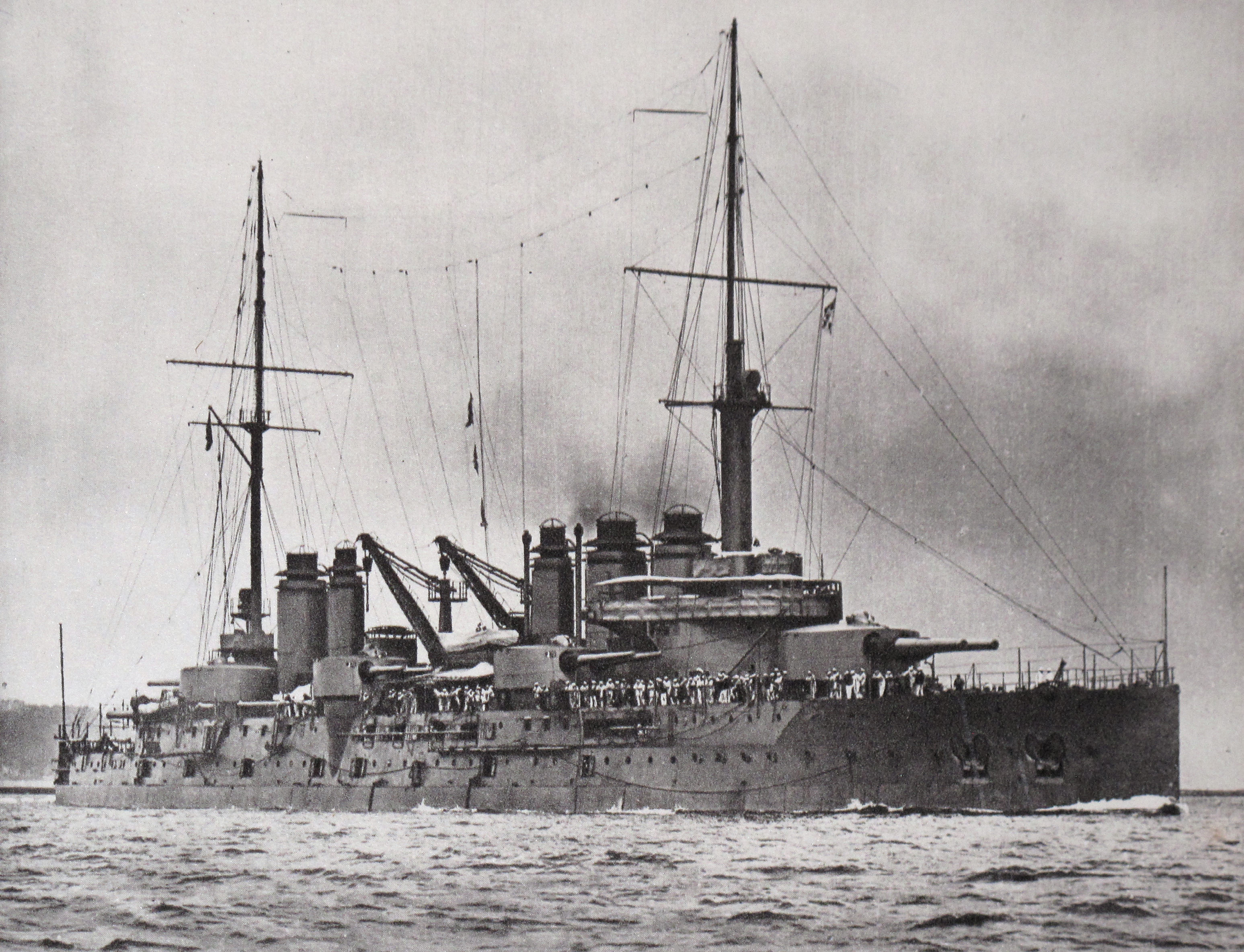
- Danton

History

France
- Name: Danton
- Namesake: Georges Danton
- Ordered: 1906 programme
- Builder: Arsenal de Brest
- Laid down: February 1906
- Launched: 4 July 1909
- Commissioned: 1 June 1911
- Fate: Sunk, 19 March 1917

General characteristics
- Class & type: Danton class
- Type: Semi-dreadnought battleship
- Displacement: 18,754 t (18,458 long tons) (normal)
- Length: 146.6 m (481 ft) (o/a)
- Beam: 25.8 m (84 ft 8 in)
- Draft: 8.44 m (27 ft 8 in)
- Installed power: 26 Belleville boilers; 22,500 PS (16,500 kW)
- Propulsion: 4 × shafts; 4 × steam turbines
- Speed: 19.25 knots (35.7 km/h; 22.2 mph)
- Complement: 25 officers and 831 enlisted men
- Armament: 2 × twin 305 mm (12 in) guns; 6 × twin 240 mm (9.4 in) guns; 16 × single 75 mm (3 in) guns; 10 × single 47 mm (1.9 in) guns; 2 × 450 mm (17.7 in) torpedo tubes
- Armor: Belt: 180–250 mm (7.1–9.8 in); Turrets: 260–340 mm (10.2–13.4 in); Conning tower: 266 mm (10.5 in)

Danton was a semi-dreadnought battleship of the French Navy and the lead ship of her class. She was a technological leap in battleship development for the French Navy, as she was the first ship in the fleet with steam turbines. However, like all battleships of her type, she was completed after the Royal Navy battleship HMS Dreadnought, and as such she was outclassed before she was even commissioned.

During her career Danton was sent to Great Britain to honor the coronation of George V, and later served in World War I as an escort for supply ships and troop transports, guarding them from elements of the German Navy. While en route to aid a blockade, she was torpedoed and sunk on 19 March 1917 by a German U-boat, leaving 296 men dead. The location of the wreck remained a mystery until an underwater survey team inadvertently discovered the battleship in December 2007. In February 2009, the wreck was confirmed to be Danton. The ship is in remarkably good shape for her age. Danton rests upright on the ocean floor, and most of the original equipment is reported to be intact.

== Design ==
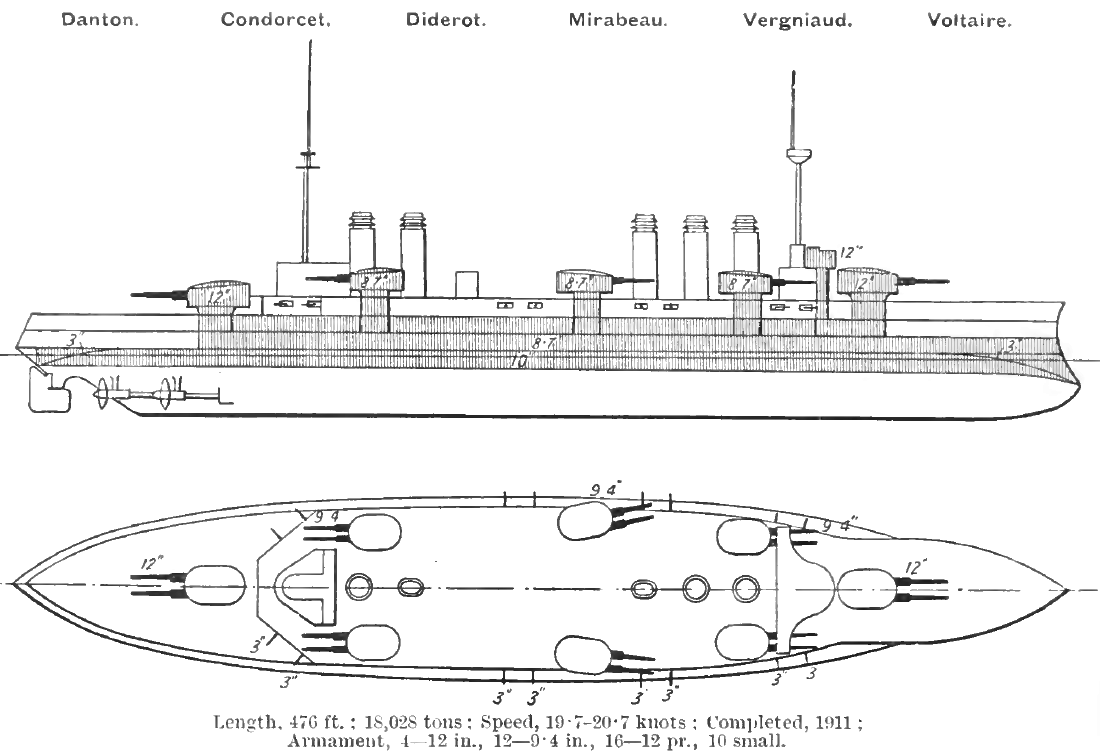
Danton-class design as depicted by Brassey's Naval Annual 1915

Although the Danton-class battleships were a significant improvement from the preceding Liberté class, especially with the 3,000-ton displacement increase, they were outclassed by the advent of the dreadnought well before they were completed. This, combined with other poor traits, including the great weight in coal they had to carry, made them rather unsuccessful ships, though their numerous rapid-firing guns were of some use in the Mediterranean.

Danton was 146.6 meters (481 ft 0 in) long overall and had a beam of 25.8 m (84 ft 8 in) and a full-load draft of 9.2 m (30 ft 2 in). She displaced 19,736 metric tons (19,424 long tons; 21,755 short tons) at full load and had a crew of 681 officers and enlisted men. She was powered by four Parsons steam turbines with twenty-six Belleville boilers, the first French warship to use turbines. They were rated at 22,500 shaft horsepower (16,800 kW) and provided a top speed of around 19 knots (35 km/h; 22 mph). Coal storage amounted to 2,027 t (1,995 long tons; 2,234 short tons).

Danton's main battery consisted of four 305mm/45 Modèle 1906 guns (12-inch) mounted in two twin gun turrets, one forward and one aft. The secondary battery consisted of twelve 240mm/50 Modèle 1902 guns in twin turrets, three on either side of the ship. A number of smaller guns were carried for defense against torpedo boats. These included sixteen 75 mm (3.0 in) L/65 guns and ten 47-millimetre (1.9 in) guns. The ship was also armed with two 450 mm (17.7 in) torpedo tubes. The ship's main belt was 270 mm (10.6 in) thick and the main battery was protected by up to 300 mm (11.8 in) of armor. The conning tower also had 300 mm thick sides.

== Service ==
Danton underway

Danton was laid down at the Arsenal de Brest in February 1906. Her launching was scheduled for May 1909, but socialist activists prevented the ship from leaving the stocks, and so the launching was delayed until on 4 July 1909. After completing fitting-out work, she was commissioned into the French Navy on 1 June 1911. A week after she was completed, she was sent to the United Kingdom in honour of the Coronation of George V in 1911. Upon her return to France, Dantonwas to the 1st Battleship Squadron in April 1912, along with her five sister ships. Later that year, while off Hyères in the Mediterranean, Danton suffered an explosion in one of her gun turrets, which killed three men and injured several others. In 1913, the squadron was joined by the two powerful dreadnoughts Courbet and Jean Bart.

Danton served in World War I in the French Mediterranean Fleet. At the outbreak of the war in early August 1914, she was assigned to guard convoys bringing French soldiers from North Africa, to protect from attack by the German battlecruiser SMS Goeben and light cruiser SMS Breslau, which were operating in the area. At the time, she remained in the 1st Battle Squadron alongside her sister ships, under the command of Vice Admiral Chocheprat. By 16 August, the French naval commander, Admiral de Lapeyrère, took the bulk of the French fleet from Malta to the entrance of the Adriatic to keep the Austro-Hungarian Navy bottled up.

=== Sinking ===
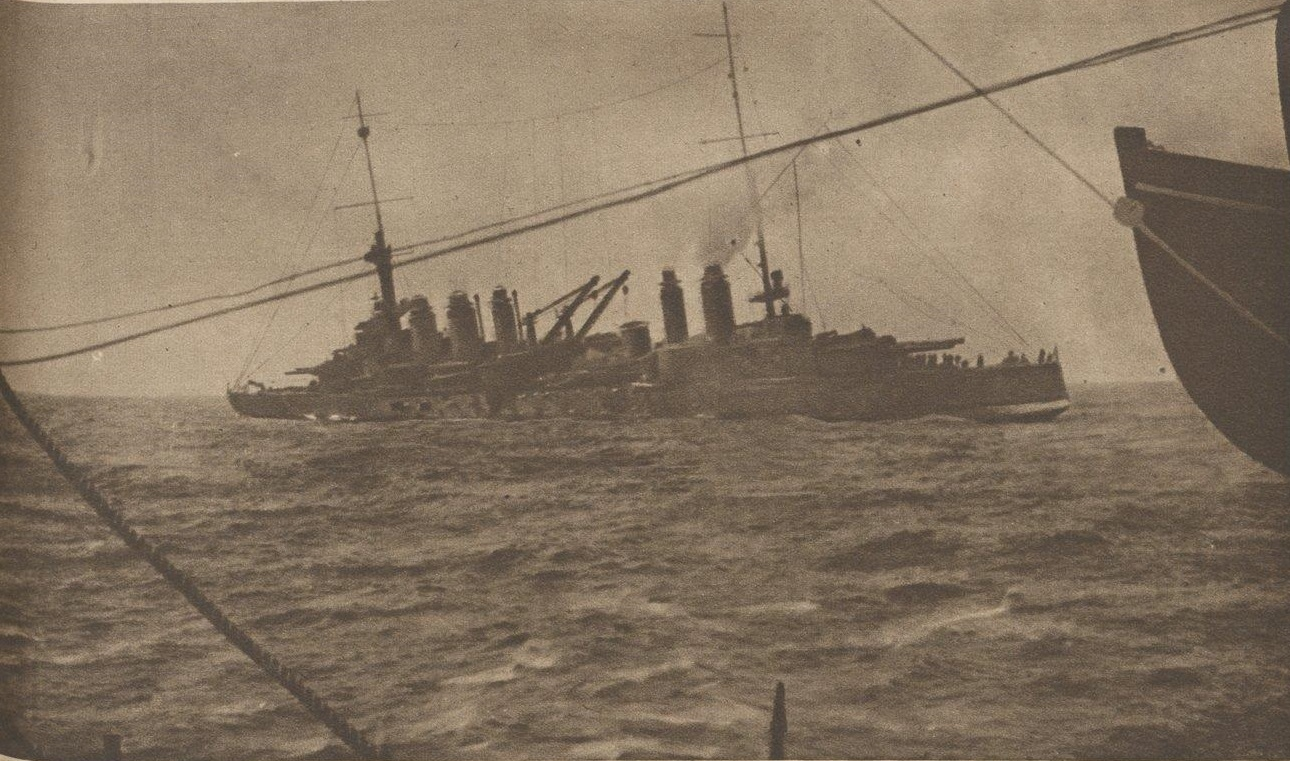
Danton sinking on 19 March 1917.

Location of the wreck

Danton, commanded by Captain Delage, was torpedoed by U-64, commanded by Kapitänleutnant Robert Moraht, at 13:17 on 19 March 1917, 22 miles (19 nmi; 35 km) south-west of Sardinia. The battleship was returning to duty from a refit in Toulon and was bound for the Greek island of Corfu to join the Allied blockade of the Strait of Otranto. Danton was carrying more men than normal, as many were crew members of other ships at Corfu, and had been zig-zagging to foil enemy submarines. The ship sank in 45 minutes; 806 men were rescued by the destroyer Massue and nearby patrol boats, but 296, including Captain Delage, went down with the ship. Massue attacked U-64 with depth charges, but the U-boat successfully evaded her attacker.

== Discovery ==
In February 2009, it was made public that in late 2007 the wreck of the ship was discovered "in remarkable condition" during an underwater survey between Italy and Algeria for the GALSI gas pipeline. The wreck lies at 38°45′35″N 8°3′30″E, a few kilometers away from where it had been thought she sank, sitting upright with many of her gun turrets intact at a depth of over 1,000 meters (550 fathoms; 3,300 ft).
