= Ateliers et Chantiers de la Loire =

French shipbuilding company

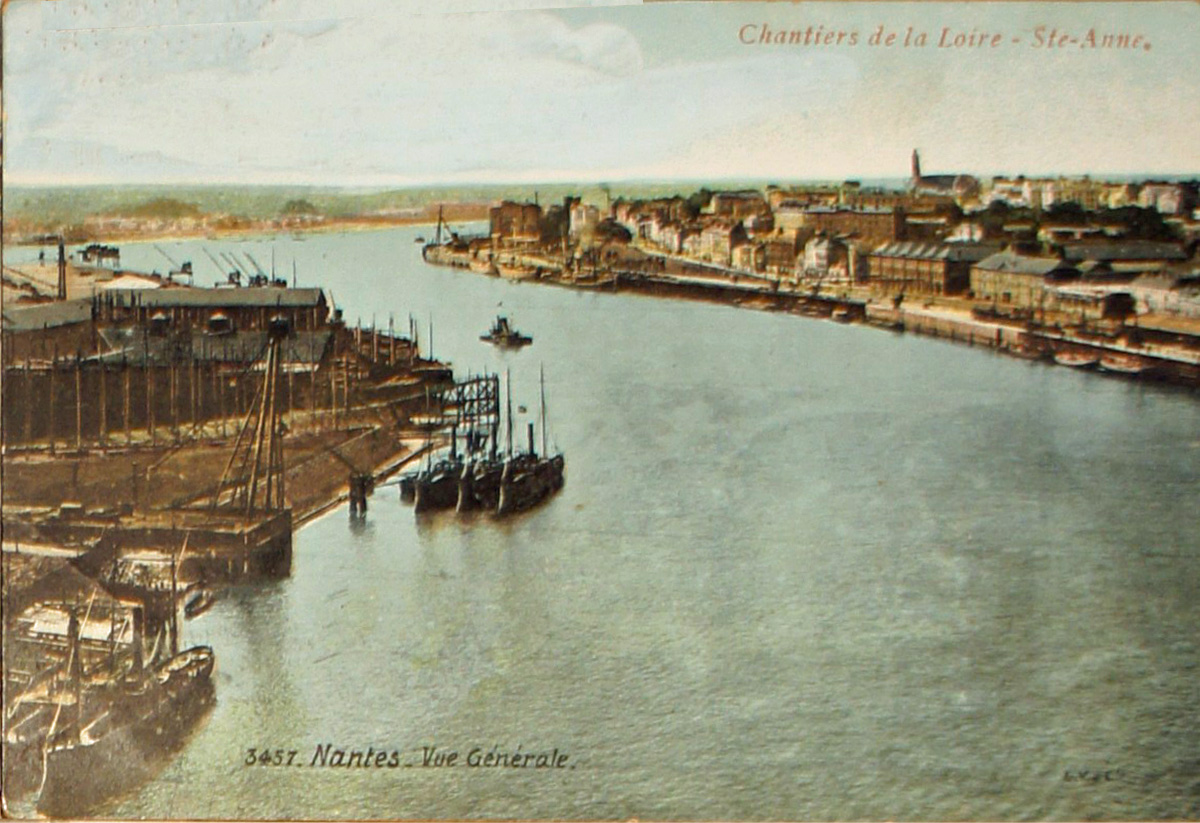
- The ACL shipyard in Nantes in 1903
- Type: Private
- Industry: Shipbuilding
- Founded: 1881
- Fate: Merged into Chantiers de l'Atlantique (1955)
- Headquarters: Nantes and Saint-Nazaire, France
- Products: Ships, engines

Ateliers et Chantiers de la Loire (ACL) was a French shipbuilding company of the late 19th and early 20th century. The name translates roughly to English as "Workshops and Shipyard of the Loire". It was formed in 1881 with shipyards in Nantes and Saint-Nazaire, and merged with Chantiers de Penhoët in 1955 to form Chantiers de l'Atlantique.

== Early years ==
In the eighteenth century Nantes had been the biggest French port, and the Loire had a major shipbuilding industry. A prime example was Dubigeon established in 1760. In the nineteenth century Nantes was surpassed by Le Havre and Marseille. In the first half of the nineteenth century a port was developed at Saint-Nazaire for ships that could no longer reach Nantes. In the second half of the nineteenth century industrialization got under way in Nantes and Saint-Nazaire. In 1861 a Scottish engineer founded the Chantiers de Penhoët at Saint-Nazaire.

Ateliers et Chantiers de la Loire (ACL) was formed in 1881 in Nantes by Jollet Babin to take advantage of the expansion of the French Navy. The shipyard was built at Prairie du Lac, near the Dubigeon yard, and the following year, in 1882, a second yard was built at St Nazaire adjacent to the Chantiers de Penhoët yard. From the outset ACL focused on building warships for the French Navy, laying down capital ships at the Saint-Nazaire site, closer to deep water, and medium–sized and small ships (cruisers, torpedo boats and, later, destroyers) at Nantes.

== The battleship race to World War I ==
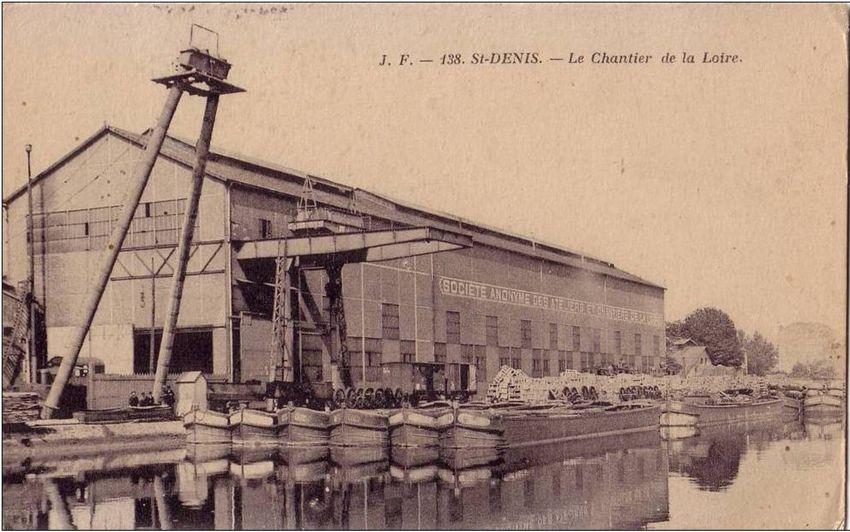
The engine and boiler factory at Saint-Denis

In September 1892 ACL Saint-Nazaire laid down its first battleship, Masséna. It seemed that the plan to get involved in construction for the French navy had succeeded, but ACL would not lay down another battleship for ten years.

In 1901 ACL took over Normandy-Laporte at Rouen and built a factory for marine boilers and marine steam engines at Saint-Denis near Paris. It was located at the confluence of the Seine and the Canal Saint-Denis, and could easily be reached by boat and by train. This might have helped to get back into the construction of battleships. Indeed, the ambition to become a leading French builder of battleships started to succeed only a few years later.

In November 1902 the Liberté was laid down in Saint-Nazaire. In 1907 ACL at Saint-Nazaire laid down two of the six Danton-class battleships, Condorcet and Diderot. In 1911 it laid down one of the Courbet-class battleships, and in 1912 one of the three Bretagne-class battleships. A fourth Bretagne-class battleship was laid down for Greece in July 1914, but Vasilefs Konstantinos would never be finished. In between a ship of the Normandie-class had been laid down in April 1913.

== World War I ==
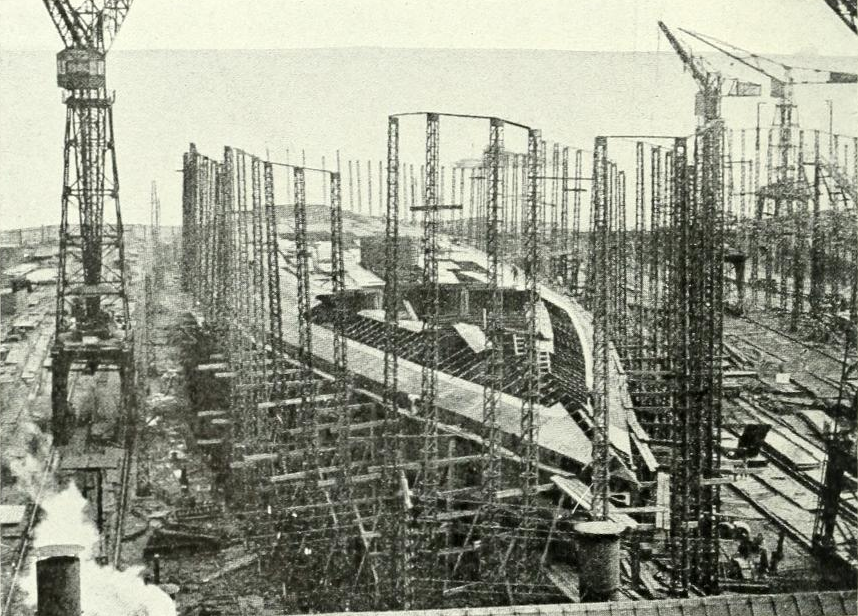
Normandie under construction

During the war battleship construction was not a priority, and so many parts of the unfinished ships were used for other ships. As a consequence the last two battleships that had been laid down at ACL were far from complete at the end of the war. By then their design was also a bit outdated, and it was decided not to finish the ships.

== Interwar years ==
=== Shift to building merchant ships ===
Already before World War I ACL had started to build ocean liners. In March 1914 it had launched the ocean liner Sphinx (151 m, 11,375 tons) for Messageries Maritimes. After the War it was clear that there would not be many orders for big warships in the near future. The logical alternative use of the slipways at Saint Nazaire would be to continue and expand the construction ocean liners. In 1921 ACL launched SS Lipari (9,954 tons) for Chargeurs Réunis. In March 1922 ACL launched SS Chantilly (152 m, 10828 tons), in November 1922 her sister SS Compiègne, and in November 1923 the third sister SS Fontainebleau. With the construction of these medium-sized ocean liners the shipyard had successfully diversified into the market for civilian ships. This was all the more important because the Washington Naval Treaty of 1922 made it clear that no more battleships would be built in the near future.

Of course ACL wanted to expand in the construction of bigger ocean liners. In the early 1920s there had been abandoned negotiations for an ocean liner with the Dutch Netherland Line or SMN. In 1923 a new tender was held by the SMN, and ACL offered for such a low price that it got the order for MS Pieter Corneliszoon Hooft, an ocean liner of 14.642 tons (21,000 tons displacement). The offer was made possible by an extremely low exchange rate of the French Franc, which had not yet been translated in increased cost. The order was also important for ACL because it was a Motor Ship, driven by Diesel engines P.C. Hooft would twice catch fire on the yard. ACL faced severe troubles to finish the ship in time, and in July 1926 she sailed to Amsterdam to be finished over there. In 1932 she was lost in a fire.

In 1929 ACL laid down the ocean liner MS Georges Philippar. She was of a size comparable to that of P.C. Hooft, but profited from advances in Diesel engine technology, making her much faster. Georges Philippar was launched in November 1930, and was burned and lost on the return voyage of her first trip in May 1932.

=== Diversification ===
Also in the inter-war years ACL diversified into naval aviation, forming an aircraft manufacturing division in 1925 It became Loire Aviation in 1930. The factory in Saint-Denis would employ up to 1,200 people in the 1920s. It built turrets and other armored parts for the Maginot line.

=== Re-entry in the battleship market ===
Before World War II, ACL co-operated with Chantiers de Penhoët in building two of France's four battleships, and had contracts for another, and two aircraft carriers, but these were not completed.

== Post World War II ==
After World War II and a decline in shipbuilding, ACL intensified its links with Chantiers de Penhoët, and the two companies merged in 1955 to form Chantiers de l'Atlantique.

== Ships ==
- Condorcet, a Danton-class battleship built in 1909
- Diderot, a Danton-class battleship built in 1909
- France, a Courbet-class battleship built in 1912
- Strasbourg, a Dunkerque-class battleship built in conjunction with C. Penhoët in 1936
- Jean Bart, a Richelieu-class battleship built in conjunction with C. Penhoët in 1939
- Ronis, a Ronis-class submarine built for the Latvian Navy in 1926

== Bibliography ==
- Chesneau, Roger (1980). Conway's All the World's Fighting Ships 1922-1946. London: Conway Maritime Press. ISBN 0-85177-146-7.
- Moore, John E. (1990) [1919]. Jane's Fighting Ships of World War I (Reprint ed.). London: Studio Editions. ISBN 1-85170-378-0.
