= French battleship Vergniaud =

French Danton-class semi-dreadnought

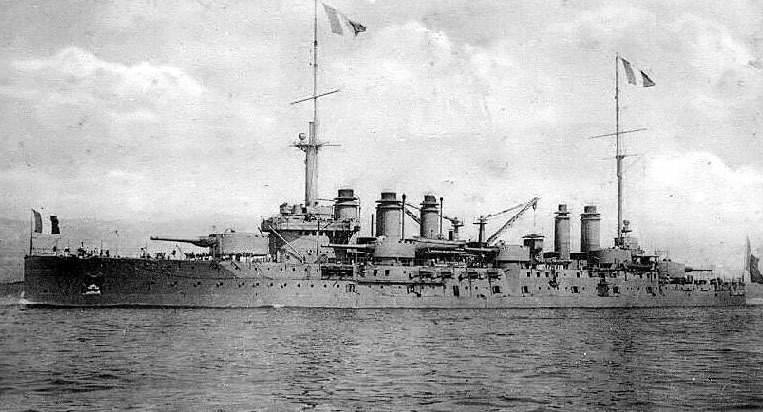
- Vergniaud

History

France
- Name: Vergniaud
- Namesake: Pierre Vergniaud
- Cost: 55,247,307 francs
- Laid down: November 1907
- Launched: 12 April 1910
- Completed: 18 December 1911
- Decommissioned: June 1921
- Stricken: 27 October 1921
- Fate: Sold for scrap, 27 November 1928

General characteristics
- Class & type: Danton class
- Type: Semi-dreadnought battleship
- Displacement: 18,754 t (18,458 long tons) (normal)
- Length: 146.6 m (481 ft) (o/a)
- Beam: 25.8 m (84 ft 8 in)
- Draft: 8.44 m (27 ft 8 in)
- Installed power: 26 Belleville boilers; 22,500 PS (16,500 kW)
- Propulsion: 4 shafts; 4 steam turbines
- Speed: 19.25 knots (35.7 km/h; 22.2 mph)
- Complement: 25 officers and 831 enlisted men
- Armament: 2 × twin 305 mm (12 in) guns; 6 × twin 240 mm (9.4 in) guns; 16 × single 75 mm (3 in) guns; 10 × single 47 mm (1.9 in) guns; 2 × 450 mm (17.7 in) torpedo tubes
- Armor: Belt: 180–250 mm (7.1–9.8 in); Turrets: 260–340 mm (10.2–13.4 in); Conning tower: 266 mm (10.5 in)

Vergniaud was one of the six Danton-class semi-dreadnought battleships built for the French Navy between 1907 and 1911. When World War I began in August 1914, she unsuccessfully searched for the German battlecruiser SMS Goeben and the light cruiser SMS Breslau in the Western Mediterranean and escorted convoys. Later that month, the ship participated in the Battle of Antivari in the Adriatic Sea and helped to sink an Austro-Hungarian protected cruiser. Vergniaud spent most of the rest of the war blockading the Straits of Otranto and the Dardanelles to prevent German, Austro-Hungarian and Turkish warships from breaking out into the Mediterranean.

She briefly participated in the occupation of Constantinople after the end of the war and was deployed in the Black Sea in early 1919 during the Allied intervention in the Russian Civil War. The ship's crew mutinied after one of its members was killed when a protest against intervention against the Bolsheviks was bloodily suppressed. Vergniaud returned to France and was later placed in reserve after a brief deployment in the Eastern Mediterranean. She was condemned in 1921 and used as a target ship until 1926. The ship was sold for scrap two years later.

== Design and description ==
Although the Danton-class battleships were a significant improvement from the preceding Liberté class, they were outclassed by the advent of the dreadnought well before they were completed. This, combined with other poor traits, including the great weight in coal they had to carry, made them rather unsuccessful ships, though their numerous rapid-firing guns were of some use in the Mediterranean.

Vergniaud was 146.6 meters (481 ft 0 in) long overall and had a beam of 25.8 meters (84 ft 8 in) and a full-load draft of 9.2 meters (30 ft 2 in). She displaced 19,736 metric tons (19,424 long tons) at deep load and had a crew of 681 officers and enlisted men. The ship was powered by four Parsons steam turbines using steam generated by twenty-six Niclausse boilers. The turbines were rated at 22,500 shaft horsepower (16,800 kW) and provided a top speed of around 19 knots (35 km/h; 22 mph). Vergniaud reached a top speed of 19.7 knots (36.5 km/h; 22.7 mph) on her sea trials. She carried a maximum of 2,027 tonnes (1,995 long tons) of coal which allowed her to steam for 3,370 nautical miles (6,240 km; 3,880 mi) at a speed of 10 knots (19 km/h; 12 mph).

Vergniaud's main battery consisted of four 305mm/45 Modèle 1906 guns mounted in two twin gun turrets, one forward and one aft. The secondary battery consisted of twelve 240mm/50 Modèle 1902 guns in twin turrets, three on each side of the ship. A number of smaller guns were carried for defense against torpedo boats. These included sixteen 75 mm (3.0 in) L/65 guns and ten 47-millimetre (1.9 in) Hotchkiss guns. The ship was also armed with two submerged 450 mm (17.7 in) torpedo tubes. The ship's waterline armor belt was 270 mm (10.6 in) thick and the main battery was protected by up to 300 mm (11.8 in) of armor. The conning tower also had 300 mm thick sides.

=== Wartime modifications ===
During the war 75 mm anti-aircraft guns were installed on the roofs of the ship's two forward 240 mm gun turrets. During 1918, the mainmast was shortened to allow the ship to fly a captive kite balloon and the elevation of the 240 mm guns was increased which extended their range to 18,000 meters (20,000 yd).

== Career ==
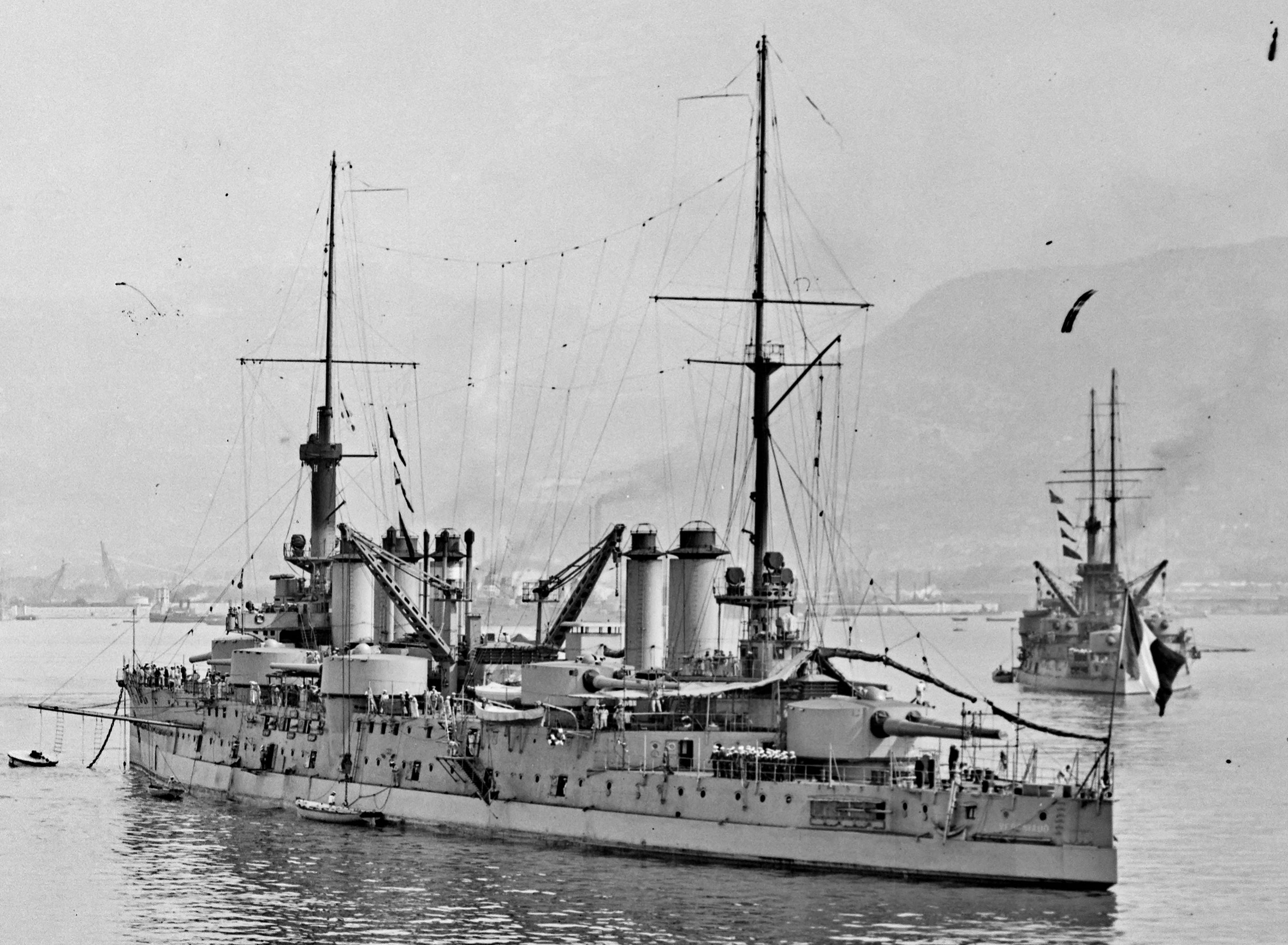
Vergniaud in Toulon, May 1914.

Construction of Vergniaud was begun on 26 December 1906 by Forges et Chantiers de la Gironde in Lormont and the ship was laid down in November 1907. She was launched on 12 April 1909 and was completed on 18 December 1911 at cost of 55,247,307 francs. The ship was assigned to the First Division of the First Squadron (escadre) of the Mediterranean Fleet when she was commissioned. The ship participated in combined fleet maneuvers between Provence and Tunisia in May–June 1913 and the subsequent naval review conducted by the President of France, Raymond Poincaré on 7 June 1913. Afterwards, Vergniaud joined her squadron in its tour of the Eastern Mediterranean in October–December 1913 and participated in the grand fleet exercise in the Mediterranean in May 1914.

=== World War I ===
At the beginning of the war, the ship, together with her sister Condorcet and the dreadnought Courbet, unsuccessfully searched for the German battlecruiser Goebenand the light cruiser Breslau in the Balearic Islands. She later escorted troop convoys from North Africa to France before she joined her sisters at Malta. On 16 August 1914 the combined Anglo-French Fleet under Admiral Auguste Boué de Lapeyrère, including Vergniaud, made a sweep of the Adriatic Sea. The Allied ships encountered the Austro-Hungarian cruiser SMS Zenta, escorted by the destroyer SMS Ulan, blockading the coast of Montenegro. There were too many ships for Zenta to escape, so she remained behind to allow Ulan to get away and was sunk by gunfire during the Battle of Antivari off the coast of Bar, Montenegro. Vergniaud was one of the ships that bombarded Cattaro on 1 September and blockaded the Strait of Otranto for the rest of the year and through August 1915. She was based at Malta and Bizerte until February 1916 when she sailed to Toulon.

Vergniaud was transferred to the Second Squadron on 27 March 1916 and resumed her former duties of blockading the Strait of Otranto from bases in Argostoli and Corfu for most of the rest of the war. The ship transferred some of her men to her sister Mirabeau that participated in the Allied attempt to ensure Greek acquiescence to Allied operations in Macedonia in Athens on 1 December 1916. The lieutenant in charge of her landing party was killed as were several other men during the incident. She was given a short refit at Toulon from 9 November 1917 to January 1918 and returned to Corfu. Vergniaud was transferred to Mudros in May to prevent Goeben from breaking out into the Mediterranean. A boiler burst on 14 September, killing four men and wounding nine others. After the Armistice of Mudros was signed on 30 October between the Allies and the Ottoman Empire, the ship participated in the early stage of the occupation of Constantinople. She returned to Toulon on 17 December for a short refit.

=== Postwar career ===
In early 1919, Vergniaud was among the ships stationed off Sevastopol as an Allied deterrent to Soviet forces who were encroaching on the city during the Russian Civil War. Despite Allied support, the city's White Russian forces were in a seemingly hopeless position, and in April 1919 the French naval high command ordered the ships to evacuate. Rejecting this, the commander of the Second Squadron, Vice-Admiral (vice-amiral) Jean-Françoise-Charles Amet, attempted to have his forces intervene in the fighting, only to have a mutiny erupt on several of his ships. War-weary sailors demanded to return home and the ensuing standoff culminated in a mass shooting of sailor demonstrators. Fifteen people were wounded, but only one died, a sailor from Vergniaud. The battleship's crew had thus far remained neutral in the conflict but quickly joined the ranks of the most radical mutineers, unfurling red banners in support of the Bolshevik forces. The four-day stalemate ended in a victory for the sailors: the ships withdrew from the Black Sea and Vergniaud returned to France. The ship departed on 29 April, towing the merchant ship SS Jerusalem to Constantinople.

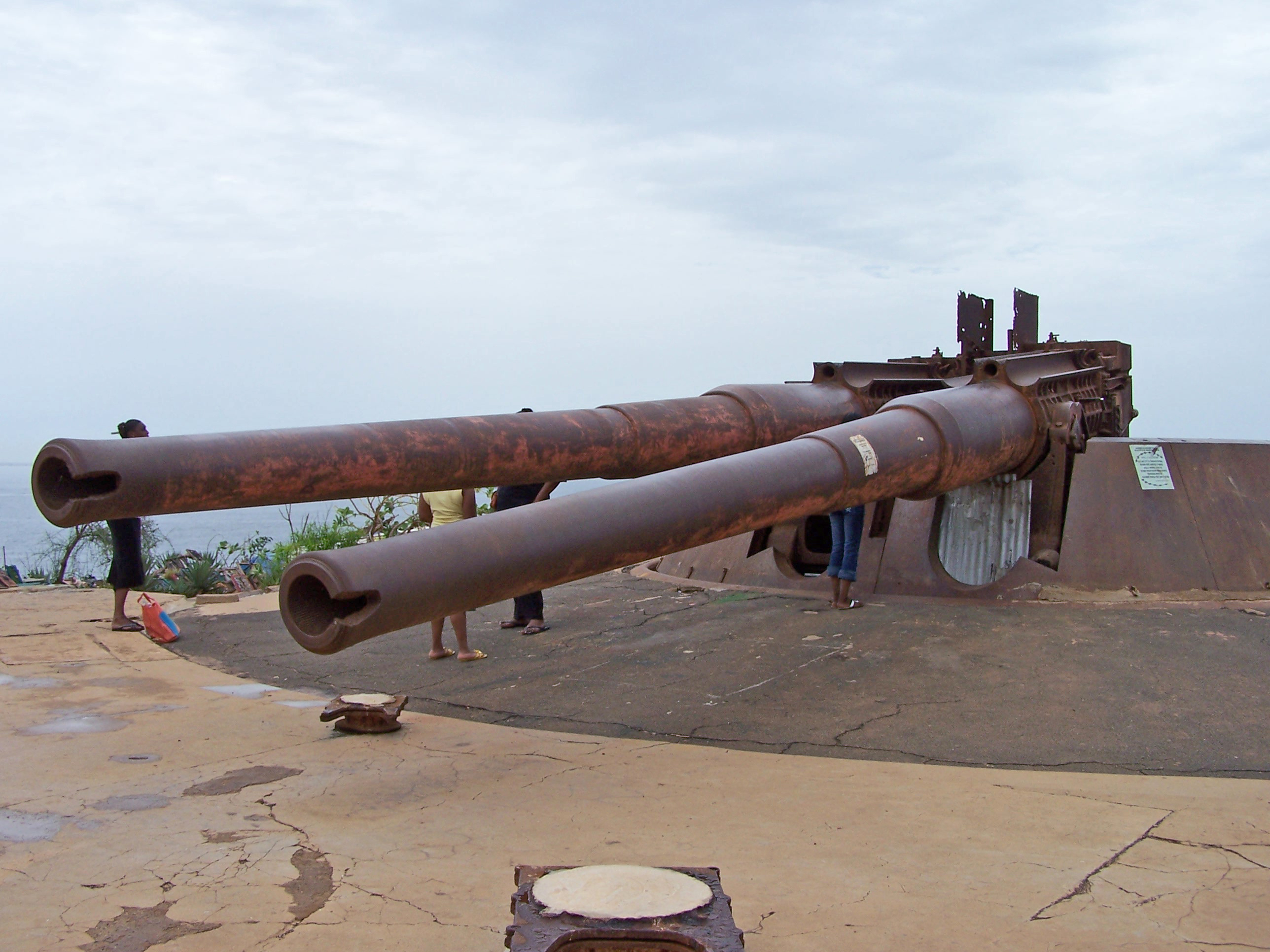
A surviving pair of 240mm/50 Modèle 1902 guns from the Vergniaud that were mounted on the Île de Gorée in Senegal.

Vergniaud was based in Beirut from May to August 1919 to monitor Turkish activities off the coasts of Palestine, Lebanon and Syria. She arrived in Toulon on 6 September and was placed in special reserve on 1 October. This ship was later found to be in poor shape, decommissioned in June 1921 and condemned on 27 October. She was disarmed in 1922. Nine of her 240mm guns were installed as coastal defence batteries around the port city of Dakar, Senegal. Two of the guns and their barbettes were sited on the Île de Gorée; due to their prominence they have become known as the "Les canons de Navaronne" after the eponymous 1961 film The Guns of Navarone. In 1940, the port batteries forced an Allied fleet to withdraw from the Vichy French port during the Battle of Dakar.

Vergniaud became a target ship and was used to evaluate the effects of poison gases and bombs until 1926. She was listed for disposal on 5 May 1927 and was sold for breaking up on 27 November 1928 for the price of 5,623,123 francs. A monument to the French mutineers of 1919 was erected by the Soviets in Sevastopol, at Morskaïa Square where Vergniaud's sailor was killed.

== Bibliography ==
- Dumas, Robert & Prévoteaux, Gérard (2011). Les Cuirassés de 18 000t. Outreau: Lela Presse. ISBN 978-2-914017-62-6.
- Gardiner, Robert & Gray, Randal, eds. (1985). Conway's All the World's Fighting Ships 1906–1921. Annapolis, Maryland: Naval Institute Press. ISBN 0-85177-245-5.
- Gille, Eric (1999). Cent ans de cuirassés français [A Century of French Battleships] (in French). Nantes: Marines édition. ISBN 2-909-675-50-5.
- Halpern, Paul G. (2004). The Battle of the Otranto Straits: Controlling the Gateway to the Adriatic in World War I. Bloomington, Indiana: Indiana University Press. ISBN 978-0-253-34379-6.
- Jordan, John & Caresse, Philippe (2017). French Battleships of World War One. Annapolis, Maryland: Naval Institute Press. ISBN 978-1-59114-639-1.
- Meirat, Jean (1978). "French Battleships Vernigaud and Condorcet". F. P. D. S. Newsletter. VI (1). F. P. D. S.: 5–6. OCLC 41554533.
- Silverstone, Paul H. (1984). Directory of the World's Capital Ships. New York: Hippocrene Books. ISBN 0-88254-979-0.
