= Paul Chocheprat =

French naval officer

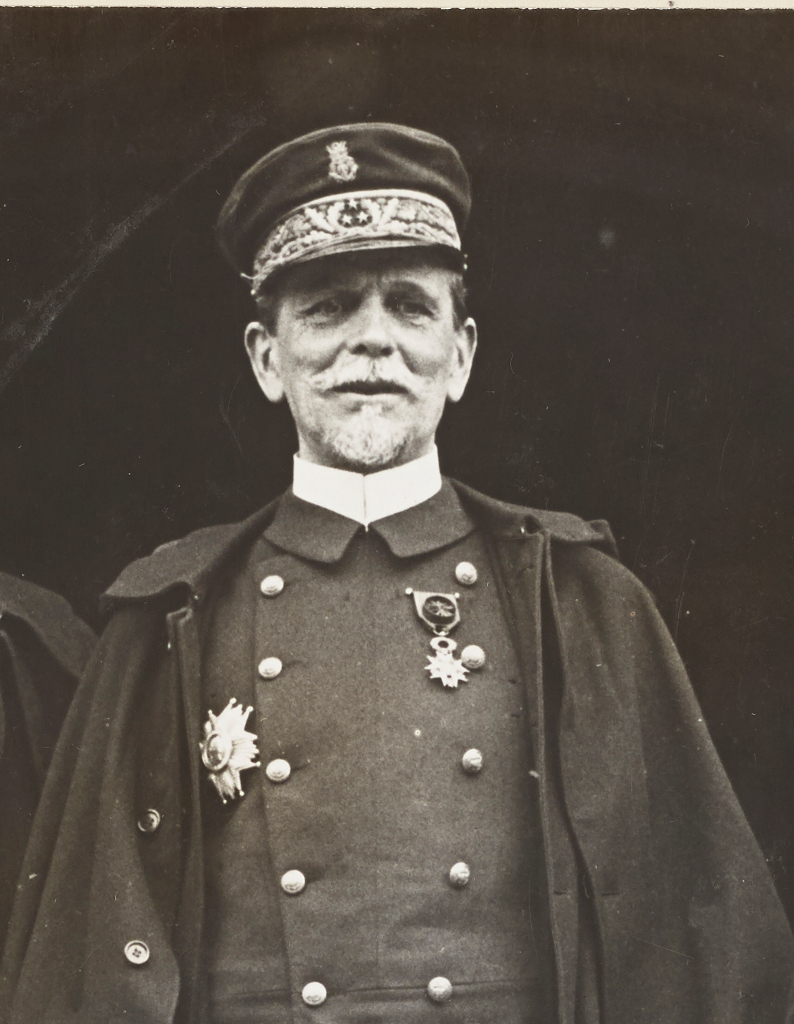
- Paul Chocheprat, April 1917
- Born: Paul-Louis-Albert Chocheprat; 11 June 1855; Périgny, Allier, France
- Died: 31 March 1928 (aged 72); Toulon, France
- Military career
- Allegiance: France
- Branch: French Navy
- Service years: 1871–1917
- Rank: vice-amiral

Paul Chocheprat (French pronunciation: [pol ʃɔʃpʁa]; 11 June 1855 – 31 March 1928) was a French naval officer who served during the First World War.

== Early life ==
He was born in Périgny, Allier.

== Career ==
He entered the École Navale (Naval School) in October 1871 and left it as an aspirant in October 1874. He then joined the gunnery training ship-of-the-line Alexandre and then on the ironclad Jeanne d'Arc in an evolution squadron in 1875 before serving on the ironclad La Galissonnière to the Pacific Naval Division (1876) where he proved to be a remarkable hydrographer.

Ensign in August 1877 on the ironclad Richelieu in a squadron of evolutions, he went in 1878 on the aviso Beaver as a maneuver officer at French Senegal and participated in expeditions on the Haut-Fleuve. Surviving a very violent bout of yellow fever, he entered in 1880 on the cruiser Armorique in the flying and training division of Cherbourg and proved himself an excellent instructor.

Promoted to lieutenant in January 1882, he commanded the battery on the unprotected cruiser Desaix then was sent to the general majority of Toulon. Officer of Admiral Benjamin Jaurès, he was appointed to the command of the evolutions squadron on the Richelieu in 1884 then became an instructor of the school of application for aspirants on the training cruiser Iphigénie in 1885.

Major (1887) of the School of Torpedo Officers in Toulon, commander of the torpedo-boat Couleuvrine in evolution wing then adjutant of division on the cruisers La Clochetterie and La Pérouse in Newfoundland (1889–1890) was promoted to frigate captain in May 1891.

He then served as a maneuver officer on the ironclad Amiral Baudin. Second of the ironclad Dévastation in the division of the Mediterranean and the Levant, it passes on the Vauban in 1893 then on the ironclad Courbet in 1894 where its qualities of maneuver are again noticed.

Commander of the aviso-transport Aube and the local station of Tahiti in 1895, he participated in the operations of Raïatea and Tahaa in January–February 1897 as well as missions to Samoa and New Hebrides.

In 1898, he was assigned to the staff at Cherbourg and in August became capitaine de vaisseau (Captain). Commander of the pre-dreadnought battleship Charles Martel in the Mediterranean (1899) then of the pre-dreadnought Charlemagne in 1902, he carried out missions in Greece and on the coasts of Morocco before being promoted to chief of general staff of the naval army during the maneuvers from 1905 to 1906. He then worked on the signal books and naval tactics redesign commission with Amiral (Admiral) François Ernest Fournier.

Rear-admiral in March 1907, he commanded the 4th division in the Mediterranean, then was promoted to vice-admiral and maritime prefect of Brest in October 1911. Maritime prefect of Toulon (November 1913), in 1914 he commanded the 1st wing in the army naval with flag on the semi-dreadnought battleship Diderot and is then one of the main collaborators of Boué de Lapeyrère.

Member in 1916 of the Superior Council of the Navy, he accompanied Joffre on a mission to the United States and passed to the reserve cadre in June 1917.

From 1920 to 1922 he chaired the Société des Œuvres de mer.

== Awards and distinctions ==
- Knight (June 29, 1886), officer (11 July 1896), commander (12 July 1910) and grand officer of the Legion of Honor (31 December 1913)
- Public education officer (1917).

== Bibliography ==
- Taillemite, Etienne (1982). Dictionnaire des marins français. Paris: Editions maritimes et d'Outre-Mer. OCLC 470113586.
