= Review (disambiguation) =

Review is an evaluation of a publication, product, service, company, or other object or idea. An article about or a compilation of reviews may itself be called a review.

Not to be confused with Revue: a form of entertainment.

Review may also refer to:

== Evaluation processes ==
- Book review, a description and evaluation of a book
- Film review, analysis and evaluation of films
- Literature review, academic review of the scholarship within a field
- Peer review, the process by which scientists assess the work of their colleagues that has been submitted for publication in the scientific literature
- Post implementation review, evaluating an entire project as part of closing, for improving the next one
- Software review, a process or meeting during which a software product is examined
- Systematic review, a focused literature review that synthesizes high-quality research relevant to a specific topic
- Taxonomic review is a novel analysis of the variation patterns in a particular taxon

== Military ==
- Fleet review (Commonwealth realms), review of ships in the Royal Navy fleet, also applicable to other Commonwealth countries
- Naval Review, review of ships in the US Navy fleet

== Arts, entertainment, and media ==
=== Music ===
- Review (Glay album), 1997
- Review (Mikuni Shimokawa album), 2003

=== Periodicals ===
- Review (magazine) a magazine covering issues of economic policy and management published by the Federal Reserve Bank of St. Louis
- Adventist Review, the official newsmagazine of the Seventh-day Adventist Church
- Pittsburgh Tribune-Review

=== Television ===
- Review with Myles Barlow, an Australian television show
- Review (TV series), an American remake of the above
- "Review" (The Bear), a 2022 television episode

== Other uses ==
- Review of a sports officiating call, through instant replay

== See also ==
- Reviewed (website), a consumer product review website
- Revue, a type of multi-act popular theatrical entertainment that combines music, dance and sketches
