= Canon de 75 mm modèle 1908 =

French naval gun

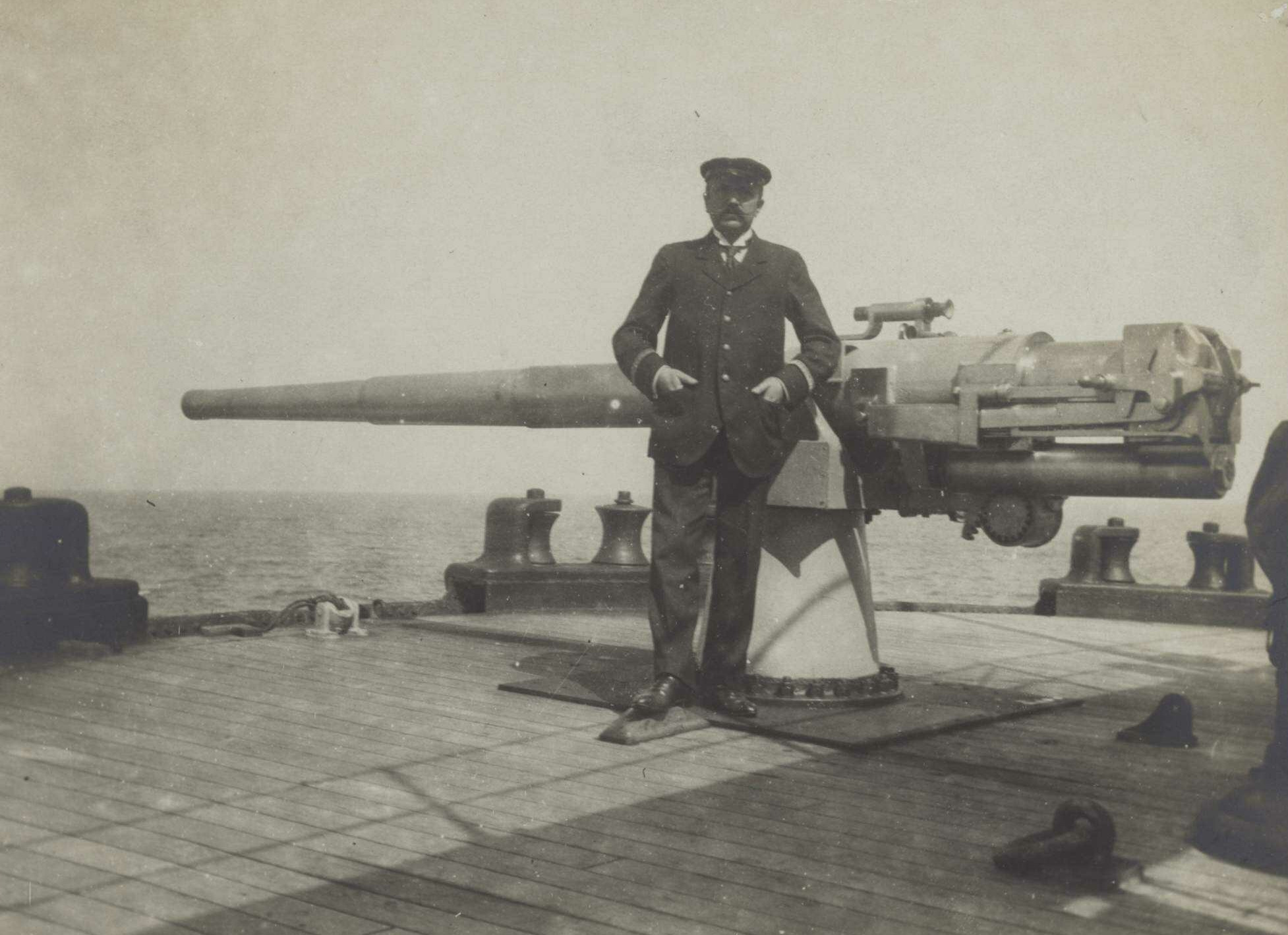
- The French caption reads "A gun from the Vergniaud".
- Type: Naval gun
- Place of origin: France

Service history
- In service: 1911–1922
- Used by: France
- Wars: World War I World War II

Production history
- Designed: 1906
- Manufacturer: Schneider-Creusot
- Produced: 1908

Specifications
- Mass: 1,450 kg (3,200 lb)
- Length: 4.857 m (15 ft 11 in)
- Barrel length: 4.688 m (15 ft 5 in) L/62.5 (bore length)
- Shell: Fixed QF
- Shell weight: 6.4 kg (14 lb)
- Caliber: 75 mm (3 in)
- Breech: Semi-automatic sliding block
- Recoil: Hydro-pneumatic
- Elevation: −10° to +25°
- Traverse: 360°
- Rate of fire: Practical: 7–15 rpm
- Muzzle velocity: 850 m/s (2,800 ft/s)
- Maximum firing range: 8,000 m (8,700 yd)
- Filling: Melinite
- Filling weight: 0.9 kg (2.0 lb)

The Canon de 75 mm modèle 1908 was a French naval gun designed before World War I. It served aboard the battleships of the Danton class.

== Bibliography ==
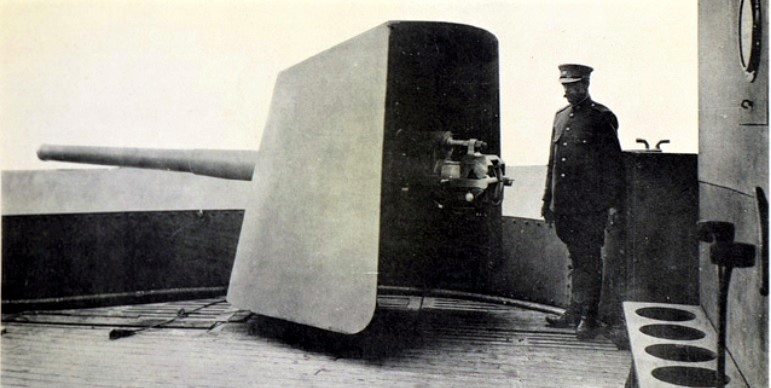
A Canon de 75 mm mle 1908 with gun shield

- Friedman, Norman (2011). Naval Weapons of World War One: Guns, Torpedoes, Mines and ASW Weapons of All Nations; An Illustrated Directory. Barnsley: Seaforth Publishing. ISBN 978-1-84832-100-7.
- Jordan, John & Caresse, Philippe (2017). French Battleships of World War One. Annapolis, Maryland: Naval Institute Press. ISBN 978-1-59114-639-1.
