= Canon de 305 modèle 1906/10 à glissement =

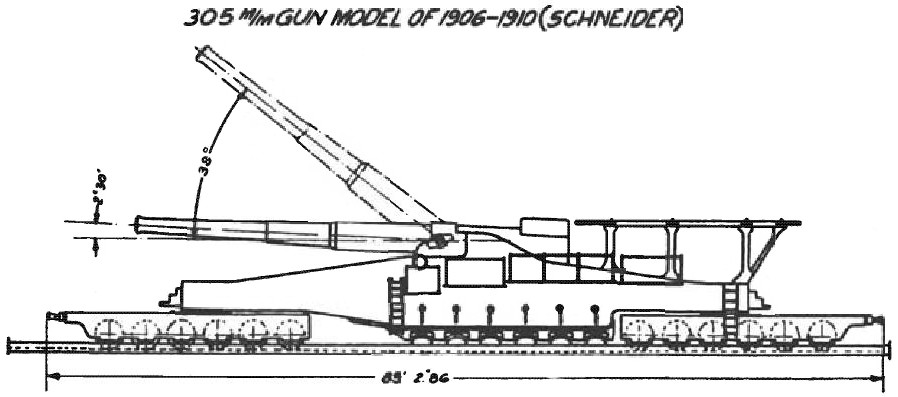
- Type: Railway gun
- Place of origin: France

Service history
- In service: 1919–1945
- Used by: France
- Wars: World War II

Production history
- Designer: Schneider
- Designed: 1918
- Manufacturer: Schneider
- Produced: 1918
- No. built: 6
- Variants: 3 with mle 1906 guns 3 with mle 1910 guns

Specifications
- Mass: 208 t (205 long tons; 229 short tons)
- Length: 27.2 m (89 ft)
- Barrel length: 12.7 m (42 ft) L/42
- Shell: Separate loading bagged charges and projectiles
- Caliber: 305 mm (12 in)
- Breech: Interrupted screw breech
- Recoil: Carriage recoil
- Carriage: Two six-axle rail bogies
- Elevation: +2 to +38°
- Traverse: None
- Rate of fire: 1 round every 4 minutes
- Muzzle velocity: 780–850 m/s (2,600–2,800 ft/s)
- Maximum firing range: 34 km (21 mi)

The Canon de 305 modèle 1906/10 à glissement was a French railway gun that was designed and produced late in World War I and delivered in January of 1919. These guns were held in reserve between the wars then mobilized by France during World War II.

== History ==
Although the majority of combatants had heavy field artillery prior to the outbreak of the First World War, none had adequate numbers of heavy guns in service, nor had they foreseen the growing importance of heavy artillery once the Western Front stagnated and trench warfare set in. Since aircraft of the period were not yet capable of carrying large diameter bombs the burden of delivering heavy firepower fell on the artillery. Two sources of heavy artillery suitable for conversion to field use were surplus coastal defense guns and naval guns.

However, a paradox faced artillery designers of the time; while large caliber naval guns were common, large caliber land weapons were not due to their weight, complexity, and lack of mobility. Large caliber field guns often required extensive site preparation because the guns had to be broken down into multiple loads light enough to be towed by a horse team or the few traction engines of the time and then reassembled before use. Building a new gun could address the problem of disassembling, transporting and reassembling a large gun, but it did not necessarily address how to convert existing heavy weapons to make them more mobile. Rail transport proved to be the most practical solution because the problems of heavy weight, lack of mobility and reduced setup time were addressed.

== Design ==
The Canon de 305 modèle 1906/10 à glissement started life as six surplus Canon de 305 modèle 1906/10 naval guns which armed Dreadnought battleships of the Danton and Courbet classes. The guns were typical built-up guns of the period which consisted of a rifled liner reinforced by layers of hoops. The 1906 guns used a Manz interrupted screw breech while the 1910 guns used a Welin interrupted screw breech and both fired separate loading bagged charges and projectiles. To load the gun the barrel was lowered to +3° and there was an elevated shell handling trolley at the rear.

The carriages consisted of a large rectangular steel base, which was suspended on two six-axle articulated rail bogies manufactured by Schneider. The number of axles was determined by the weight limit for European railways of 17 tonnes per axle. The carriage was similar to that used by the contemporary Canon de 305 modèle 1893/96 à glissement produced by Schneider and was beefed up to accommodate the guns greater weight 208 t (205 long tons; 229 short tons) vs 175 t (172 long tons; 193 short tons). The barrel alone weighed 54,560 kg (120,280 lb) mle 06/10 vs 48,075 kg (105,987 lb) mle 93/96. Since the carriage did not have a traversing mechanism it was aimed by drawing the guns across a section of curved track. Once in firing position, a section of rail bed was reinforced with wood and iron beams to support the weight of the gun. Six steel beams under the center of the carriage were then lowered to lay across the tracks and the carriage was jacked up to take the weight off the bogies and anchor the gun in place. When the gun fired the entire carriage recoiled a few feet and was stopped by the friction of the beams on the tracks. The carriage was then lowered onto its axles and was either pushed back into place with a shunting locomotive or a windlass mounted on the front of the carriage pulled the carriage back into position. This cheap, simple and effective system came to characterize Schneider's railway guns during the later war years and is known as the Glissement system.

== World War II ==
Six guns were mobilized at the beginning of the Second World War by the French Army. Three guns were assigned to the fifth Heavy Artillery Battery of the 372° Regiment of the ALVF (Artillerie Lourde sur Voie Ferrée) stationed first at Kuntzig and then Brieulles-sur-Meuse. The guns of the fifth battery were one of the few ALVF batteries that was able to shell the Germans advancing through Luxembourg from the Ardennes. Between 10 May 1940 and 12 June 1940 fifty-four shells were fired at targets along N3 and the railroad station at Alzingen. Three guns were assigned to the eleventh Heavy Artillery Battery of the 373° Regiment of the ALVF stationed first at Wolfgantzen and later evacuated to Roche-lez-Beaupré.

== Ammunition ==
- APC (Armor Piercing Capped) - 428–435 kg (944–959 lb)
- HE (High Explosive) - 351 kg (774 lb)
