= French battleship France =

French Navy Courbet-class battleship

Coordinates: 47°27′6″N 3°2′0″W

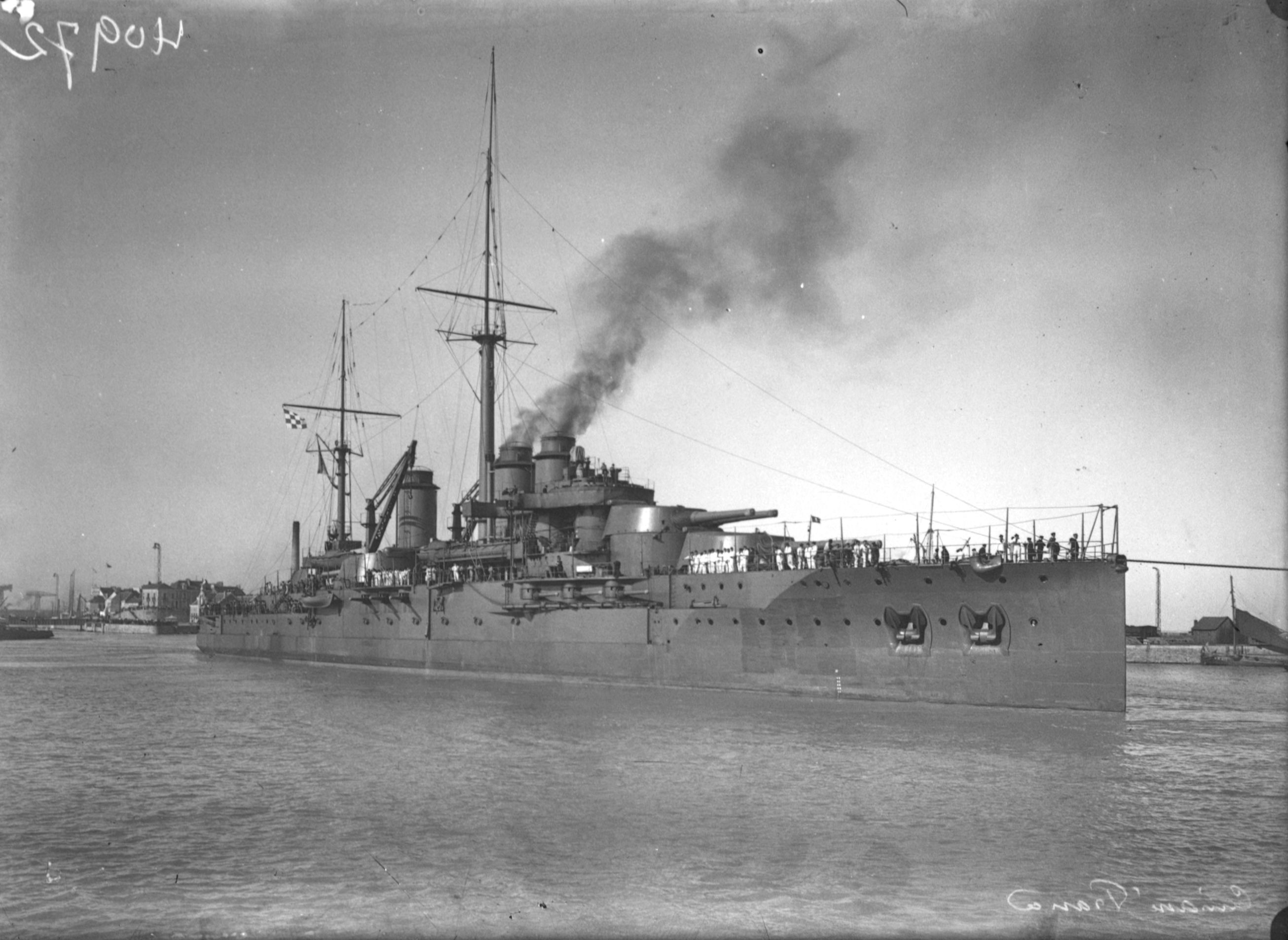
- France in Toulon harbour

History

France
- Name: France
- Namesake: France
- Ordered: 1 August 1911
- Builder: Ateliers et Chantiers de la Loire, Saint-Nazaire
- Laid down: 30 November 1911
- Launched: 7 November 1912
- Completed: 1 July 1914
- In service: 10 October 1914
- Fate: Foundered, 26 August 1922

General characteristics (as built)
- Class & type: Courbet-class battleship
- Displacement: 23,475 t (23,104 long tons) (normal); 25,579 t (25,175 long tons) (full load)
- Length: 166 m (544 ft 7 in) (o/a)
- Beam: 27 m (88 ft 7 in)
- Draught: 9.04 m (29 ft 8 in)
- Installed power: 28,000 PS (20,594 kW; 27,617 shp); 24 × Belleville boilers
- Propulsion: 4 × Shafts; 2 × steam turbine sets
- Speed: 21 knots (39 km/h; 24 mph)
- Endurance: 4,200 nmi (7,800 km; 4,800 mi) at 10 knots (19 km/h; 12 mph)
- Complement: 1,115 (1,187 as flagship)
- Armament: 6 × twin 305 mm (12 in) guns; 22 × single 138.6 mm (5.5 in) guns; 4 × single 47 mm (1.9 in) guns; 4 × 450 mm (17.7 in) torpedo tubes
- Armour: Waterline belt: 140–250 mm (5.5–9.8 in); Deck: 40–70 mm (1.6–2.8 in); Turrets: 250 mm (9.8 in); Conning tower: 266 mm (10.5 in); Casemates: 160 mm (6.3 in)

France was the last of four Courbet-class battleships, the first dreadnoughts built for the French Navy. The ship was completed just before the start of World War I in August 1914. Even though France was not officially completed, she ferried the President of France to Russia during the July Crisis for consultations. She spent the war providing cover for the Otranto Barrage that blockaded the Austro-Hungarian Navy in the Adriatic Sea and sometimes served as a flagship. After the war France and her sister ship Jean Bart participated in the occupation of Constantinople and were then sent to the Black Sea in 1919 to support Allied troops in the Southern Russia Intervention. The war-weary crews of both ships briefly mutinied, but it was easily put down and she returned to France mid-year. Striking an uncharted rock off the French coast in 1922, she foundered four hours later.

== Background and description ==
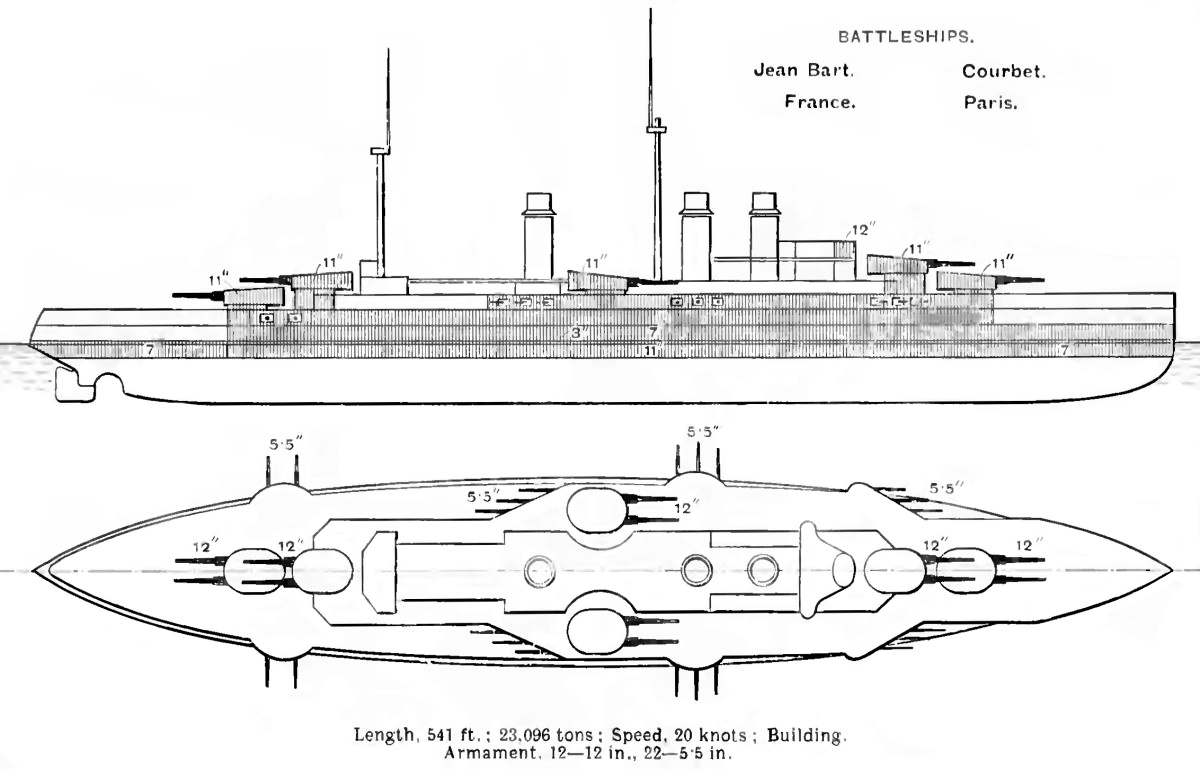
Right elevation and deck plan as depicted in Brassey's Naval Annual 1912

By 1909, the French Navy was finally convinced of the superiority of the all-big-gun battleship like HMS Dreadnought over the mixed-calibre designs like the Danton class which had preceded the Courbets. The following year, the new Minister of the Navy, Augustin Boué de Lapeyrère, selected a design that was comparable to the foreign dreadnoughts then under construction as part of the 1906 Naval Programme.

The ships were 166 metres (544 ft 7 in) long overall and had a beam of 27 metres (88 ft 7 in) and a mean draught of 9.04 metres (29 ft 8 in). They displaced 23,475 tonnes (23,104 long tons) at normal load and 25,579 tonnes (25,175 long tons) at deep load. Their crew numbered 1,115 men as a private ship and increased to 1,187 when serving as a flagship. The ships were powered by two licence-built Parsons steam turbine sets, each driving two propeller shafts using steam provided by 24 Belleville boilers. These boilers were coal-burning with auxiliary oil sprayers and were designed to produce 28,000 metric horsepower (20,594 kW; 27,617 shp). The ships had a designed speed of 21 knots (39 km/h; 24 mph). The Courbet-class ships carried enough coal and fuel oil to give them a range 4,200 nautical miles (7,800 km; 4,800 mi) at a speed of 10 knots (19 km/h; 12 mph).

The main battery of the Courbet class consisted of twelve Canon de 305 mm (12 in) Mle 1906–1910 guns mounted in six twin-gun turrets, with two pairs of superfiring turrets fore and aft of the superstructure, and a pair of wing turrets amidships. Their secondary armament was twenty-two Canon de 138.6 mm (5.5 in) Mle 1910 guns, which were mounted in casemates in the hull. Four Canon de 47 mm (1.9 in) Mle 1902 Hotchkiss guns were fitted, two on each broadside in the superstructure. They were also armed with four 450-millimetre (17.7 in) submerged torpedo tubes and could stow 10 mines below decks. The ships' waterline belt ranged in thickness from 140 to 250 mm (5.5 to 9.8 in) and was thickest amidships. The gun turrets were protected by 250 mm of armour and 160 mm (6.3 in) plates protected the casemates. The curved armoured deck was 40 mm (1.6 in) thick on the flat and 70 mm (2.8 in) on the outer slopes. The conning tower had a 266 mm (10.5 in) thick face and sides.

== Career ==
France, the seventh ship of her name to serve in the French Navy, was ordered on 1 August 1911 from Ateliers et Chantiers de la Loire. The ship was laid down on 30 November at its shipyard in Saint-Nazaire and launched on 7 November 1912. She was formally declared completed on 1 July 1914 to carry President Raymond Poincaré, on a state visit to Saint Petersburg, Russia. He boarded the ship on 16 July. Escorted by Jean Bart, France arrived at Kronstadt on 20 July after encountering the battlecruisers of the German I Scouting Group in the Baltic Sea en route. The French ships made a port visit to Stockholm, Sweden, on 25–26 July, but a planned visit to Copenhagen, Denmark, was cancelled due to rising tensions between Austria-Hungary and Serbia; they arrived at Dunkerque on 29 July.

=== World War I ===
When France declared war on Germany on 3 August, the sisters were in Brest and departed for Toulon that night. They were met off Valencia, Spain, on the 6th by their sister Courbet and the semi-dreadnoughts Condorcet and Vergniaud because Jean Bart was having problems with her 305 mm ammunition and France had yet to load any. The ships rendezvoused with a troop convoy the following day and escorted it to Toulon. France entered service on 10 October and was assigned to the 2nd Battle Squadron (2ème Escadre de ligne) of the 1st Naval Army (1ère Armée Navale) on 21 October at the mouth of the Adriatic Sea to prevent the Austro-Hungarian fleet from attempting to break out of the Adriatic. The torpedoing of Jean Bart on 21 December by the Austro-Hungarian submarine U-12 showed that the battleships were vulnerable to this threat and they were withdrawn to spend the rest of the month further south at an anchorage in Navarino Bay.

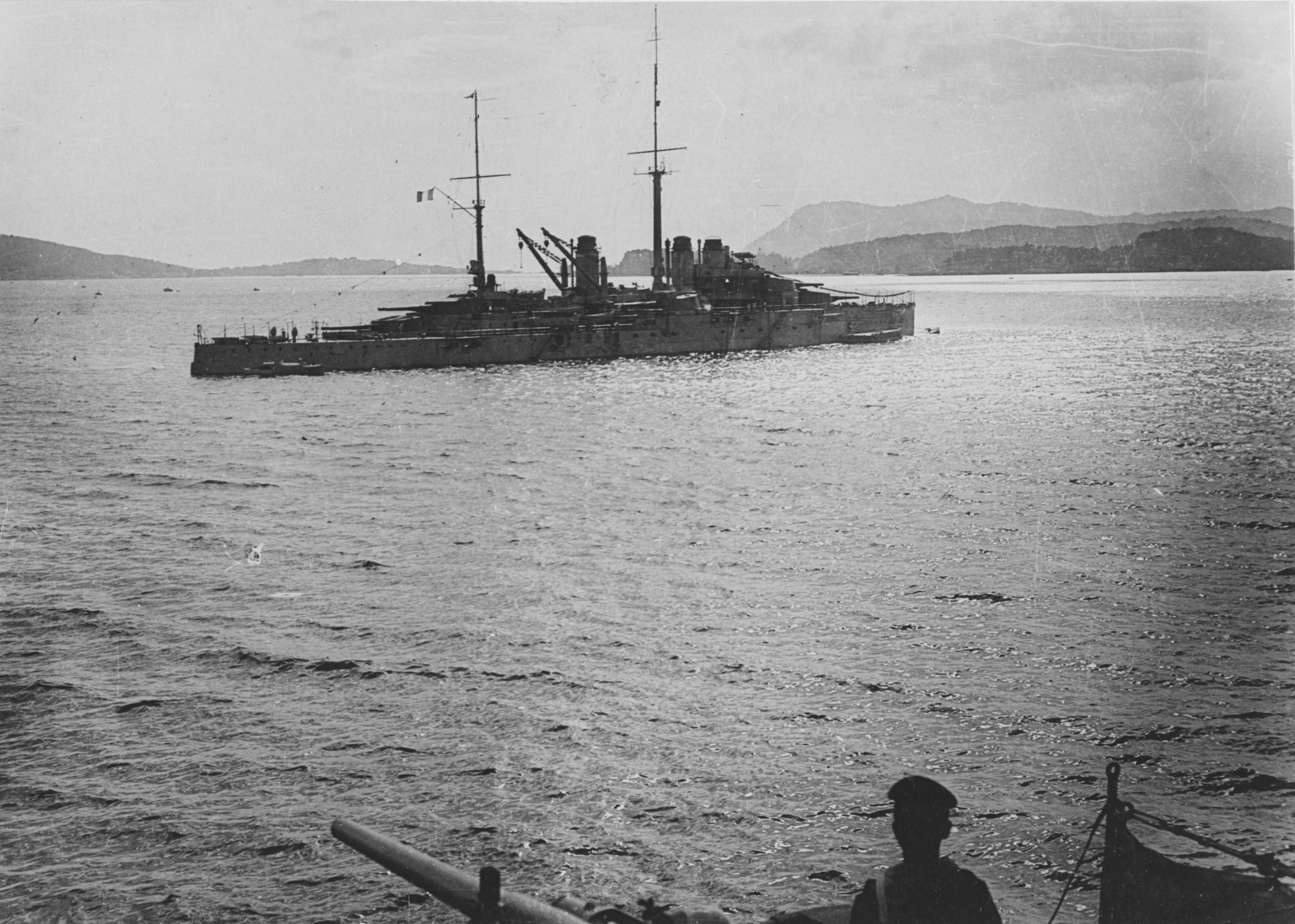
France anchored in Toulon during World War I

On 11 January 1915, the French were alerted that the Austro-Hungarian fleet was going to sortie from its base at Pola, so France and her sisters Courbet and Paris led the 1st Naval Army north to the Albanian coast. It proved to be a false alarm, and they were back at their moorings three days later. In the meantime, the ships patrolled the Ionian Sea as the danger of submarine attacks in the restricted waters of the Strait forced the battleships south. The declaration of war on Austria-Hungary by Italy on 23 May and the Italian decision to assume responsibility for naval operations in the Adriatic, allowed the French Navy to withdraw to either Malta or Bizerte, French Tunisia, to cover the Otranto Barrage. A fire broke out aboard France on 25 July and she was forced to return to Toulon for repairs that lasted until 14 October. Two days later Vice-Admiral (Vice-amiral) Louis Dartige du Fournet assumed command of the 1st Naval Army and hoisted his flag aboard France, which remained in Malta for the rest of the year. At some point during the year, the ship's 47 mm guns were put on high-angle mountings to allow them to be used as anti-aircraft (AA) guns. They were later supplemented by a pair of 75 mm (3 in) Mle 1891 G guns on anti-aircraft mounts.

On 27 April 1916, the French began using the port of Argostoli on the Greek island of Cephalonia as a base. Dartige du Fornet transferred his flag to the battleship Provence on 23 May. Around this time, many men from the battleships' crews were transferred to anti-submarine ships. At the beginning of 1917, the French began to use the Greek island of Corfu as well, but growing shortages of coal severely limited the battleships' ability to go to sea. The situation was so bad that Vice-Admiral Gabriel Darrieus wrote in 1917:

The military capabilities of the Armée Navale, which has already been badly affected by the shortages of personnel and constant changes in the general staff, need to be maintained by frequent exercises, and although from March to June we were able to follow a normal pattern, the coal crisis is currently preventing any manoeuvres or gunnery training, even for the ships returning from repairs. The big ships have lost 50 per cent of the capability they had several months ago.

In 1918, they were almost immobile, leaving Corfu only for maintenance and repairs. On 1 July, the 1st Naval Army was reorganised with France assigned to the 1st Battle Division (1ère Division de ligne) of the 1st Battle Squadron (1ère Escadre de ligne).

=== Post-war activities ===
After the Armistice of Mudros was signed on 30 October between the Allies and the Ottoman Empire, the ship participated in the occupation of Constantinople. In early 1919, France, flagship of Vice-Admiral Jean-Françoise-Charles Amet, and Jean Bart were transferred to the Black Sea to reinforce the French forces opposing the Bolsheviks. A few days after bombarding Bolshevik troops advancing on Sevastopol on 16 April and forcing them to retreat, France's war-weary crew briefly mutinied on 19 April, inspired by socialist and revolutionary sympathisers. Unlike Jean Bart's captain, who had managed to quell the mutiny aboard his ship by the following day, France's crew was still mutinous and Amet hoped to reduce tensions by meeting the mutineers' demands for leave and letting crewmen with a history of good behaviour ashore. The sailors mingled with a pro-Bolshevik demonstration and the mixed group was challenged by a company of Greek infantry, which opened fire. The demonstrators fled and encountered a landing party from Jean Bart, which also fired upon them. A total of about 15 people were wounded, included six sailors, one of whom later died of his wounds. Delegates from the other mutinous crews were not allowed aboard and the mutiny collapsed when Amet agreed to meet their main demand to take the ships home. France was the first to depart on 23 April, but the ship sailed to Bizerte before continuing onwards to Toulon. Twenty-six crewmen were sentenced to prison terms upon her return, although the sentences were commuted in 1922 as part of a bargain between Poincaré, now Prime Minister, and the parties of the left.

On 1 July, all the Courbets were assigned to the 1st Division of the 1st Squadron. On 10 February 1920, the 1st Naval Army was disbanded and replaced by the Eastern Mediterranean Squadron (Escadre de la Méditerranée orientale) and its Western counterpart (Escadre de la Méditerranée occidentale); all the sisters were assigned to the 1st Battle Squadron of the latter unit, with Courbet, Jean Bart and Paris in the 1st Battle Division and France in the 2nd Battle Division, with Rear-Admiral (Contre-amiral) Louis-Hippolyte Violette commanding the latter from France. The two squadrons were combined into the Mediterranean Squadron (Escadre de la Méditerranée) on 20 July 1921.

France and the battleship Bretagne hosted the British battleship Queen Elizabeth and light cruiser Coventry during a port visit to Villefranche from 18 February to 1 March 1922. The two French battleships had a gunnery exercise on 28 June using the former Austro-Hungarian battleship Prinz Eugen as a target and sank her. On 18 July, France, Paris and Bretagne began a cruise visiting French ports in the Bay of Biscay and English Channel. On the evening of 25/26 August, France struck an uncharted rock while entering Quiberon Bay at 00:57. The after boiler room flooded quickly and the ship lost all power at 01:10. She had a 5° list by 02:00 and the order was given to abandon ship. The battleship capsized two hours later after Bretagne and Paris were able to rescue all but three of her crew. Her wreck was slowly broken up in place in 1935, 1952 and 1958.

== Bibliography ==
- Dumas, Robert (1985). "The French Dreadnoughts: The 23,500 ton Courbet Class". In John Roberts (ed.). Warship. Vol. IX. Annapolis, Maryland: Naval Institute Press. pp. 154–164, 223–231. ISBN 978-0-87021-984-9. OCLC 26058427.
- Gardiner, Robert & Gray, Randal, eds. (1985). Conway's All the World's Fighting Ships 1906–1921. Annapolis, Maryland: Naval Institute Press. ISBN 978-0-87021-907-8.
- Halpern, Paul G. (2004). The Battle of the Otranto Straits: Controlling the Gateway to the Adriatic in World War I. Bloomington, Indiana: Indiana University Press. ISBN 978-0-253-34379-6.
- Jordan, John & Caresse, Philippe (2017). French Battleships of World War One. Annapolis, Maryland: Naval Institute Press. ISBN 978-1-59114-639-1.
- Masson, Philippe (2003). "The French Naval Mutinies, 1919". In Bell, Christopher M. & Elleman, Bruce A. (eds.). Naval Mutinies of the Twentieth Century: An International Perspective. Cass Series: Naval Policy and History. Vol. 19. London: Frank Cass. ISBN 978-0-7146-5456-0.
- Roche, Jean-Michel (2005). Dictionnaire des bâtiments de la flotte de guerre française de Colbert à nos jours [Dictionary of French Warships from Colbert to Today] (in French). Vol. Tome 2: 1871–2006. Toulon: Group Retozel-Maury Millau. OCLC 470444756.
- Whitley, M. J. (1998). Battleships of World War Two: An International Encyclopedia. Annapolis, Maryland: Naval Institute Press. ISBN 978-1-55750-184-4.
