= French battleship Jean Bart (1911) =

Courbet-class battleship

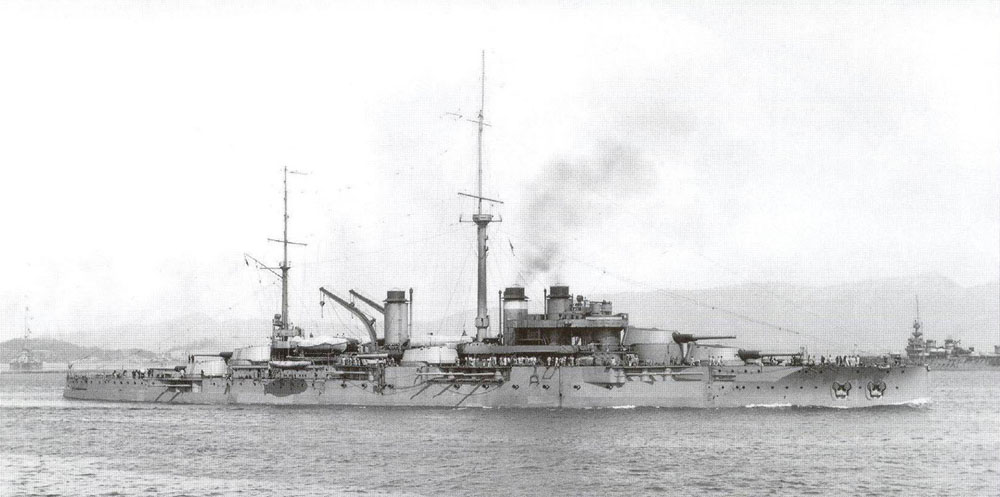
- Jean Bart in 1914

History

France
- Name: Jean Bart
- Namesake: Jean Bart
- Ordered: 11 August 1910
- Builder: Arsenal de Brest, Brest
- Cost: F60,200,000
- Laid down: 15 November 1910
- Launched: 22 September 1911
- Completed: 2 September 1913
- Commissioned: 19 November 1913
- Decommissioned: 15 August 1935
- Renamed: Océan, 1 January 1937
- Reclassified: As a training ship, 1 November 1934; As an accommodation ship, 1936
- Captured: 27 November 1942 by Nazi Germany
- Fate: Scrapped, 14 December 1945

General characteristics (as built)
- Class & type: Courbet-class battleship
- Displacement: 23,475 t (23,104 long tons) (normal); 25,579 t (25,175 long tons) (full load)
- Length: 166 m (544 ft 7 in) (o/a)
- Beam: 27 m (88 ft 7 in)
- Draught: 9.04 m (29 ft 8 in)
- Installed power: 28,000 PS (20,594 kW; 27,617 shp); 24 × Belleville boilers
- Propulsion: 4 × shafts; 2 × steam turbine sets
- Speed: 21 knots (39 km/h; 24 mph)
- Endurance: 4,200 nmi (7,800 km; 4,800 mi) at 10 knots (19 km/h; 12 mph)
- Complement: 1,115 (1,187 as flagship)
- Armament: 6 × twin 305 mm (12 in) guns; 22 × single 138 mm (5.4 in) guns; 4 × single 47 mm (1.9 in) guns; 4 × 450 mm (17.7 in) torpedo tubes
- Armour: Waterline belt: 140–250 mm (5.5–9.8 in); Deck: 40–70 mm (1.6–2.8 in); Turrets: 250–360 mm (9.8–14.2 in); Conning tower: 266 mm (10.5 in)

Jean Bart was the second of four Courbet-class battleships, the first dreadnoughts built for the French Navy. She was completed before World War I as part of the 1910 naval building programme. She spent the war in the Mediterranean and helped to sink the Austro-Hungarian protected cruiser Zenta on 16 August 1914. She was torpedoed by an Austro-Hungarian submarine in December and steamed to Malta for repairs that required three and a half months. She spent the rest of the war providing cover for the Otranto Barrage that blockaded the Austro-Hungarian Navy in the Adriatic Sea and sometimes served as a flagship.

After the war, she and her sister ship France participated in the occupation of Constantinople and were then sent to the Black Sea in 1919 to support Allied troops in the Southern Russia Intervention. Jean Bart's war-weary crew briefly mutinied, but it was easily put down and she returned to France mid-year. She was partially modernised twice during the 1920s, but was deemed to be in too poor condition to be refitted again in the 1930s. Therefore, she became a training ship in 1934 and was then disarmed and hulked as an accommodation ship in 1935–1936 in Toulon. The Germans captured her intact when they occupied Toulon in 1942 and used her for testing large shaped charge warheads. She was sunk by Allied bombing in 1944, and after the war ended, was refloated and scrapped beginning in late 1945.

== Background and description ==
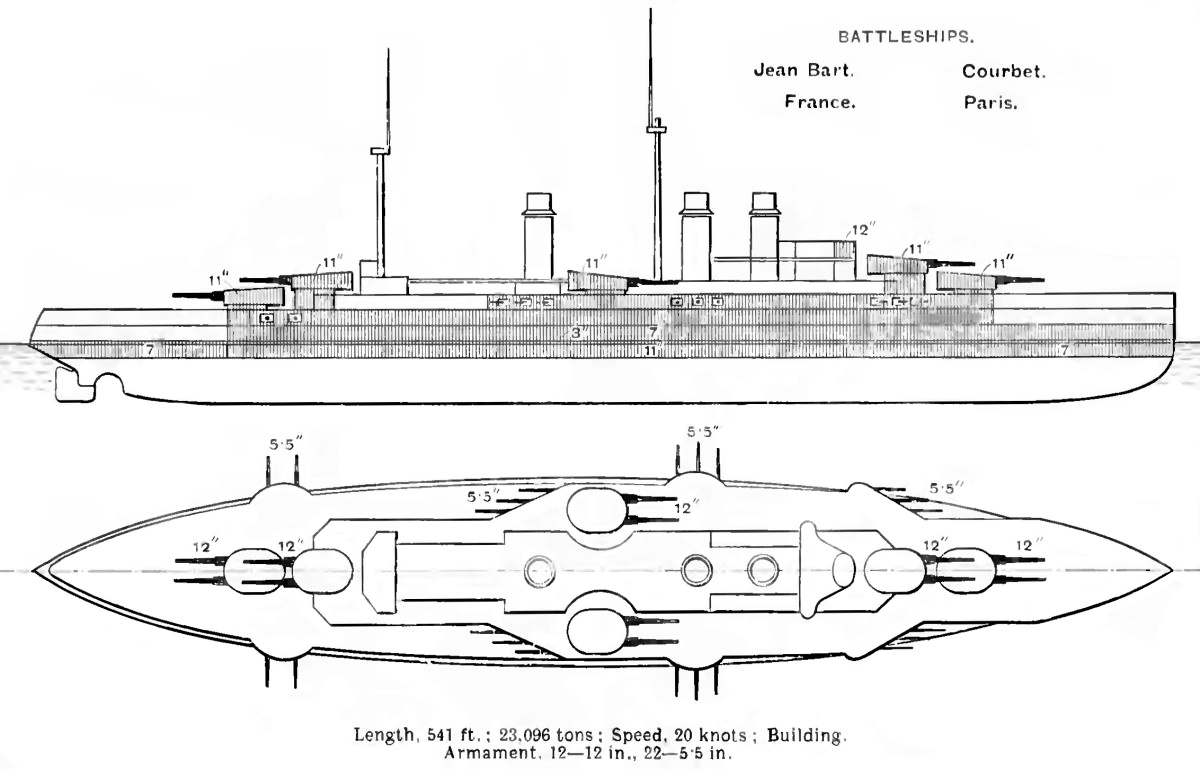
Right elevation and deck plan as depicted in Brassey's Naval Annual 1912

By 1909, the French Navy was convinced of the superiority of the all-big-gun battleship like HMS Dreadnought over the mixed-calibre designs like the Danton class which had preceded the Courbets. The following year, the new Minister of the Navy, Augustin Boué de Lapeyrère, selected a design that was comparable to the foreign dreadnoughts then under construction, to be built as part of the 1906 Naval Programme.

The ships were 166 metres (544 ft 7 in) long overall and had a beam of 27 metres (88 ft 7 in) and a mean draught of 9.04 metres (29 ft 8 in). They displaced 23,475 tonnes (23,104 long tons) at normal load and 25,579 tonnes (25,175 long tons) at deep load. Their crew numbered 1,115 men as a private ship and increased to 1,187 when serving as a flagship. The ships were powered by two licence-built Parsons steam turbine sets, each driving two propeller shafts using steam provided by 24 Belleville boilers. These boilers were coal-burning with auxiliary oil sprayers and were designed to produce 28,000 metric horsepower (20,594 kW; 27,617 shp). The ships had a designed speed of 21 knots (39 km/h; 24 mph). The Courbet-class ships carried enough coal and fuel oil to give them a range of 4,200 nautical miles (7,800 km; 4,800 mi) at a speed of 10 knots (19 km/h; 12 mph).

The main battery of the Courbet class consisted of twelve Canon de 305-millimetre (12 in) Mle 1906–1910 guns mounted in six twin-gun turrets, with two pairs of superfiring turrets fore and aft of the superstructure, and a pair of wing turrets amidships. Their secondary armament was twenty-two Canon de 138-millimetre (5.4 in) Mle 1910 guns, which were mounted in casemates in the hull. Four Canon de 47-millimetre (1.9 in) Mle 1902 Hotchkiss guns were fitted, two on each broadside in the superstructure. They were also armed with four 450-millimetre (17.7 in) submerged torpedo tubes, a pair on each broadside, and could stow 10 mines below decks. The ships' waterline belt ranged in thickness from 140 to 250 mm (5.5 to 9.8 in) and was thickest amidships. The gun turrets were protected by 250–360 millimetres (9.8–14.2 in) of armour and 160-millimetre (6.3 in) plates protected the casemates. The curved armoured deck was 40 mm (1.6 in) thick on the flat and 70 mm (2.8 in) on the outer slopes. The conning tower had 266 mm (10.5 in) thick face and sides.

== Construction and career ==
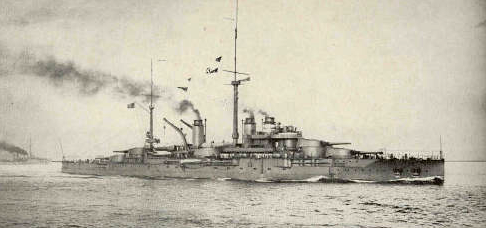
Jean Bart in 1913

Jean Bart was ordered on 11 August 1910 and named after the privateer Jean Bart. She was laid down on 15 November 1910 at the Arsenal de Brest and launched on 22 September 1911. The ship was completed on 2 September 1913 at a cost of F60,200,000 and visited Dunkerque, the birthplace of her namesake on 18 September. She was commissioned into the fleet on 19 November together with her sister Courbet. They were assigned to the 1st Battle Division (1ère Division de ligne) of the 1st Battle Squadron (1ère Escadre de ligne) of the 1st Naval Army (1ère Armée Navale), at Toulon in mid-November. Jean Bart steamed to Brest on 24 June 1914 to rendezvous with her sister France, who had not yet finished her trials. Raymond Poincaré, President of the French Republic, boarded France on 16 July for a state visit to Saint Petersburg, Russia. After encountering the battlecruisers of the German I Scouting Group in the Baltic Sea en route, the ships arrived at Kronstadt on 20 July. They made a port visit to Stockholm, Sweden, on 25–26 July, but a planned visit to Copenhagen, Denmark, was cancelled due to rising tensions between Austria-Hungary and Serbia and the ships arrived at Dunkerque on 29 July.

=== World War I ===
When France declared war on Germany on 2 August, the sisters were in Brest and departed for Toulon that night. They were met off Valencia, Spain, on the 6th by Courbet and the semi-dreadnoughts Condorcet and Vergniaud because Jean Bart was having problems with her 305 mm ammunition and France had yet to load any. The ships rendezvoused with a troop convoy the following day and escorted it to Toulon.

When France followed with a declaration of war on Austria-Hungary on 12 August, Vice-Admiral (Vice-amiral) Augustin Boué de Lapeyrère, now commander of the Allied naval forces in the Mediterranean, decided on a sortie into the Adriatic intended to force the Austro-Hungarian fleet to give battle. After rendezvousing with a small British force on the 15th, he ordered his forces to split with the battleships headed for Otranto, Italy, while the armoured cruisers patrolled off the Albanian coast. Before the two groups got very far apart, several Austro-Hungarian ships were spotted on 16 August and the Allied fleet was successful in cutting off and sinking the protected cruiser Zenta off Antivari, although the destroyer SMS Ulan managed to escape. The following day, Boué de Lapeyrère transferred his flag to Jean Bart. On 1 September the 1st Naval Army briefly bombarded Austro-Hungarian coastal fortifications defending the Bay of Cattaro to discharge the unfired shells remaining in the guns after sinking Zenta. Boué de Lapeyrère transferred his flag to Jean Bart's newly arrived sister Paris on 11 September. Aside from several uneventful sorties into the Adriatic, the French capital ships spent most of their time cruising between the Greek and Italian coasts to prevent the Austro-Hungarian fleet from attempting to break out of the Adriatic.

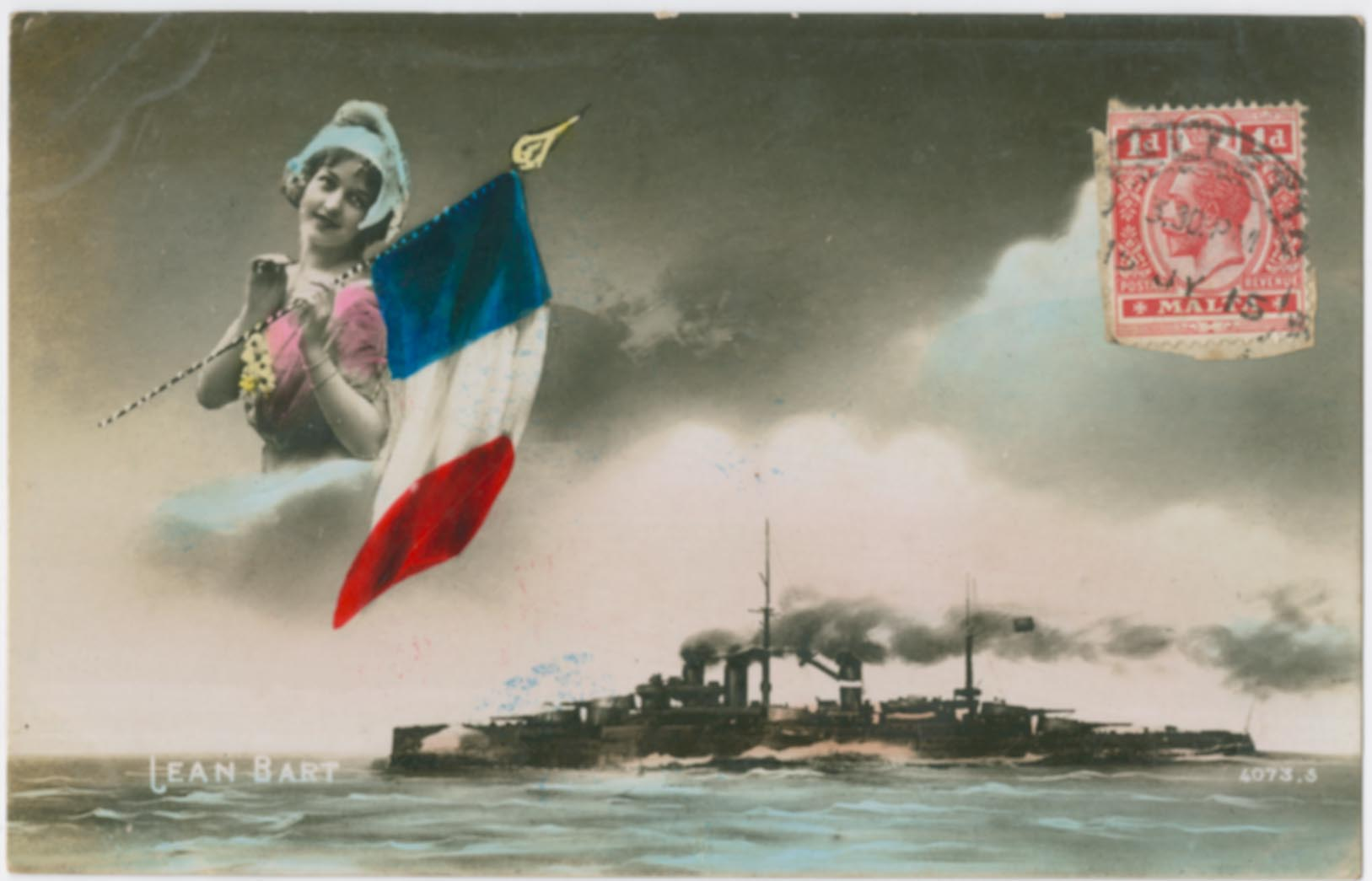
Patriotic postcard featuring Jean Bart posted from Malta (1915)

Jean Bart was torpedoed on 21 December by the Austro-Hungarian submarine U-12 off Sazan Island. A single torpedo struck her in the wine store in the bow, blowing a hole through the compartment. The ship took on 400 tonnes (390 long tons) of water, but was able to reach the Greek island of Cephalonia where temporary repairs were made. She was able to steam to Malta on her own for permanent repairs that lasted from 26 December to 3 April 1915. This attack highlighted the danger of submarine attacks in the restricted waters of the Strait and forced the battleships south to patrol in the Ionian Sea. The declaration of war on Austria-Hungary by Italy on 23 May and the Italian decision to assume responsibility for naval operations in the Adriatic, allowed the French Navy to withdraw to either Malta or Bizerte, French Tunisia, to cover the Otranto Barrage. At some point during the year, Jean Bart's 47 mm guns were put on high-angle mountings to allow them to be used as anti-aircraft (AA) guns. They were later supplemented by a pair of 75 mm (3 in) Mle 1891 G guns on anti-aircraft mounts. On 27 April 1916, the French began using the port of Argostoli on the Greek island of Cephalonia as a base. Around this time many men from the battleships' crews were transferred to anti-submarine ships. At the beginning of 1917, the French began to use the Greek island of Corfu as well, but growing shortages of coal severely limited the battleships' ability to go to sea. The situation was so bad that Vice-Admiral Gabriel Darrieus wrote in 1917:

The military capabilities of the Armée Navale, which has already been badly affected by the shortages of personnel and constant changes in the general staff, need to be maintained by frequent exercises, and although from March to June we were able to follow a normal pattern, the coal crisis is currently preventing any manoeuvres or gunnery training, even for the ships returning from repairs. The big ships have lost 50 per cent of the capability they had several months ago.

In 1918, they were almost immobile, leaving Corfu only for maintenance and repairs. On 1 July, the Naval Army was reorganised with Jean Bart, Paris and Courbet assigned to the 2nd Battle Division of the 1st Battle Squadron.

=== Interwar years ===
After the Armistice of Mudros was signed on 30 October between the Allies and the Ottoman Empire, the ship participated in the occupation of Constantinople. In early 1919, Jean Bart was transferred to the Black Sea to reinforce the French forces opposing the Bolsheviks. A few days after bombarding Bolshevik troops advancing on Sevastopol on 16 April and forcing them to retreat, her war-weary crew briefly mutinied on 19 April, inspired by socialist and revolutionary sympathisers. Jean Bart's captain was able to restore order aboard his ship the following day and mustered a landing party to patrol the city. France's crew was still mutinous, so Vice-Admiral Jean-Françoise-Charles Amet, commander of the ships in the Black Sea, hoped to reduce tensions by meeting the mutineers' demands for leave by letting crewmen with a history of good behaviour ashore. The sailors mingled with a pro-Bolshevik demonstration and the mixed group was challenged by a company of Greek infantry which opened fire. The demonstrators fled and encountered Jean Bart's landing party, which also fired upon them. A total of about 15 people were wounded, included six sailors, one of whom later died of his wounds. Delegates from the other mutinous crews were not allowed aboard and the mutiny collapsed when Amet agreed to meet their main demand to take the ships home. Three crewmen were sentenced to prison terms upon her return, although the sentences were commuted in 1922 as part of a bargain between Prime Minister Raymond Poincaré and the parties of the left.

The ship returned to Toulon by 1 July and was placed in reserve. On 10 February 1920, the 1st Naval Army was disbanded and replaced by the Eastern Mediterranean Squadron (Escadre de la Méditerranée orientale) and its Western counterpart (Escadre de la Méditerranée occidentale); all the Courbets were assigned to the 1st Battle Squadron of the latter unit, with Courbet, Jean Bart and Paris in the 1st Battle Division and France in the 2nd Battle Division. Vice-Admiral Charles Charlier commanded both the 1st Division and the Western Mediterranean Squadron at this time. The two squadrons were combined into the Mediterranean Squadron (Escadre de la Méditerranée) on 20 July 1921. In June 1923, the 1st Battle Division, including Jean Bart, was cruising off the coast of North Africa when Courbet had a boiler-room fire.

Jean Bart received the first of her two refits between 12 October 1923 and 29 January 1925. This included replacing one set of four boilers with oil-fired du Temple boilers and trunking together her two forward funnels. The maximum elevation of the main armament was increased from 12° to 23° which increased their maximum range to 26,000 metres (28,000 yd). Her existing AA guns were replaced with four 75 mm Modèle 1918 AA guns and 1.5-metre (4 ft 11 in) and 1-metre (3 ft 3 in) stereoscopic rangefinders were installed for the AA guns. A new tripod foremast with a fire-control position at its top was fitted and her bow armour was removed to make her more seaworthy. Barr & Stroud 2-metre (6 ft 7 in) FT coincidence rangefinders were installed for the 14 cm guns in October 1925.

In mid-1925, the ship participated in manoeuvres in the Atlantic Ocean with Courbet and Paris and then made port visits to Saint-Malo, Cherbourg and numerous ports along the Atlantic coast of France before returning to Toulon on 12 August. Jean Bart was briefly refitted between 12 August and 1 September 1927 and was then decommissioned on 15 August 1928 in preparation for her extensive modernisation that began on 7 August 1929. This was much more extensive than her earlier refit as all her boilers were replaced or overhauled and six of her original coal-fired boilers were replaced by oil-fired du Temple boilers. Jean Bart's fire-control systems were comprehensively upgraded with the installation of a Saint-Chamond-Granat system in a director-control tower (DCT) on the top of the tripod mast and all her original rangefinders were replaced with the exception of the Barr & Stroud FT rangefinders in the main-gun turrets. The DCT was fitted with a Barr & Stroud 4.57-metre (15 ft) Modèle 1912 coincidence rangefinder and a Zeiss 3-metre (9 ft 10 in) stereoscopic rangefinder was added to the DCT to measure the distance between the target and shell splashes. Additional 4.57-metre Mle 1912 rangefinders were added in a duplex mounting atop the conning tower and another at the base of the mainmast. A traversable Zeiss 8.2-metre (26 ft 11 in) rangefinder was fitted to the roof of the forward superfiring turret in lieu of its FT model rangefinder and FTs were installed in the new gunnery directors for the secondary armament. The ship's Mle 1918 AA guns were exchanged for seven Canon de 75 mm Modèle 1922 guns and they were provided with a pair of high-angle OPL Modèle 1926 3-metre (9 ft 10 in) stereoscopic rangefinders, one on top of the duplex unit on the roof of the conning tower and one in the aft superstructure.

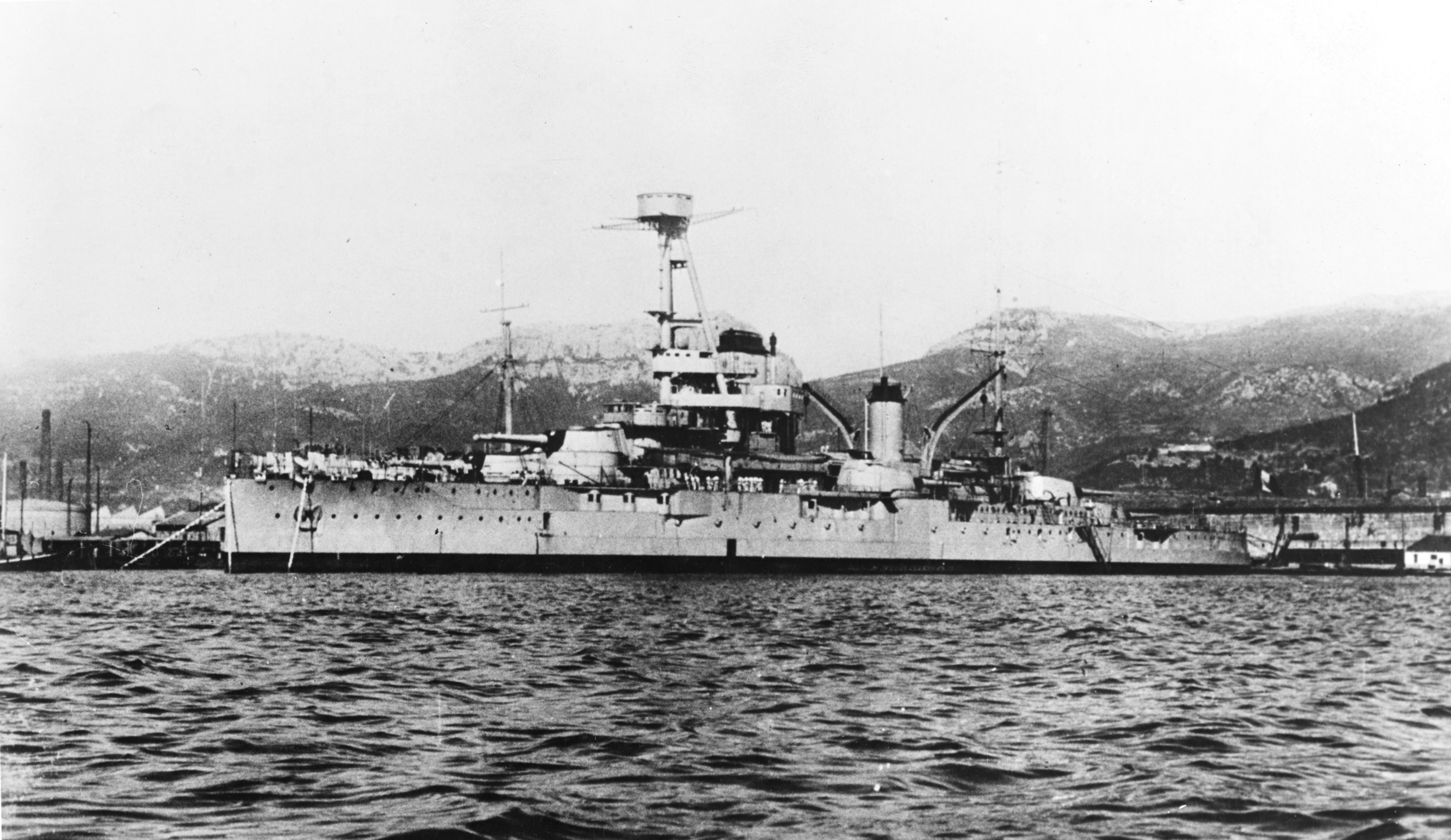
Océan in Toulon, circa 1939

The modernisation was completed on 29 September 1931 and Jean Bart recommissioned on 1 October as the flagship of the 2nd Battle Division commanded by Rear Admiral (contre-amiral) Hervé. Her machinery trials lasted until 13 February 1932 and she then made port visits to Bizerte, Crete, Egypt, French Lebanon, Corfu, and Greece in April and May. Rear Admiral Jean-Pierre Esteva relieved Hervé on 1 August and the ship was refitted from 10 October to 24 November in Toulon after which she spent five days in Ajaccio, Corsica. Jean Bart exercised with the Mediterranean Squadron in the first half of 1933 and made port visits in French North Africa, Mallorca, Spain and Casablanca, French Morocco. After a collision on 6 August with the destroyer Le Fortuné in Toulon harbour that damaged the latter's stern, the battleship was under repair from 8 to 15 August. From 20 April to 29 June 1934, the Mediterranean Squadron conducted its usual manoeuvres and port visits. The 2nd Battle Division was disbanded on 1 August and Jean Bart briefly served as the squadron flagship. The ship was assigned to the Training Division on 1 November and served as a school for stokers and signalmen. She made her last sea voyage on 15 June 1935.

Her condition was poor enough by that time that she was not thought to be worth the expense of a third refit similar to those her sisters received. Jean Bart was hulked and disarmed in Toulon beginning on 15 August for service as an accommodation ship for the naval schools in Toulon. She was renamed Océan on 1 January 1937 to free her name for use by the new Richelieu-class battleship Jean Bart then under construction. The ship was captured intact by the Germans on 27 November 1942 when they occupied Vichy France. The Germans used her for experiments in late 1943 with shaped-charge warheads intended to be delivered by Mistel composite aircraft. The 8,000-pound (3,600 kg) warhead was positioned in front of the main-gun turrets, the closest one of which had its armour reinforced by an additional 100-millimetre (3.9 in) plate. The high-velocity jet formed by the shaped charge penetrated through the additional armour, the 300-millimetre (11.8 in) turret-face armour, the 360-millimetre rear armour and the front and rear of the aft turret, and into the superstructure to a total depth of 28 metres (92 ft). She was sunk by Allied aircraft in 1944 and later raised for scrapping, which began on 14 December 1945.

== Bibliography ==
- Dumas, Robert (1985). "The French Dreadnoughts: The 23,500 ton Courbet Class". In John Roberts (ed.). Warship. Vol. IX. Annapolis, Maryland: Naval Institute Press. pp. 154–164, 223–231. ISBN 0-87021-984-7. OCLC 26058427.
- Forsyth, Robert (2001). Mistel: German Composite Aircraft and Operations, 1942–1945. Crowborough, UK: Classic Publications. ISBN 1-903223-09-1.
- Halpern, Paul G. (2004). The Battle of the Otranto Straits: Controlling the Gateway to the Adriatic in World War I. Bloomington, Indiana: Indiana University Press. ISBN 978-0-253-34379-6.
- Jordan, John & Caresse, Philippe (2017). French Battleships of World War One. Annapolis, Maryland: Naval Institute Press. ISBN 978-1-59114-639-1.
- Jordan, John & Moulin, Jean (2015). French Destroyers: Torpilleurs d'Escadre & Contre-Torpilleurs 1922–1956. Barnsley, UK: Seaforth Publishing. ISBN 978-1-84832-198-4.
- Masson, Philippe (2003). "The French Naval Mutinies, 1919". In Bell, Christopher M. & Elleman, Bruce A. (eds.). Naval Mutinies of the Twentieth Century: An International Perspective. Cass Series: Naval Policy and History. Vol. 19. London: Frank Cass. pp. 106–122. ISBN 978-0-7146-5456-0.
- Silverstone, Paul H. (1984). Directory of the World's Capital Ships. New York: Hippocrene Books. ISBN 0-88254-979-0.
- Whitley, M. J. (1998). Battleships of World War Two: An International Encyclopedia. Annapolis, Maryland: Naval Institute Press. ISBN 1-55750-184-X.
