= Kënzeg =

Kënzeg may refer to:

- Clemency, Luxembourg, in Luxembourgish Kënzeg or in German Küntzig, a town and a former commune in south-western Luxembourg
- Kuntzig, in German Künzig or Kënzeg, a commune in the Moselle department in Grand Est in north-eastern France
