= French battleship Paris =

French Courbet-class battleship

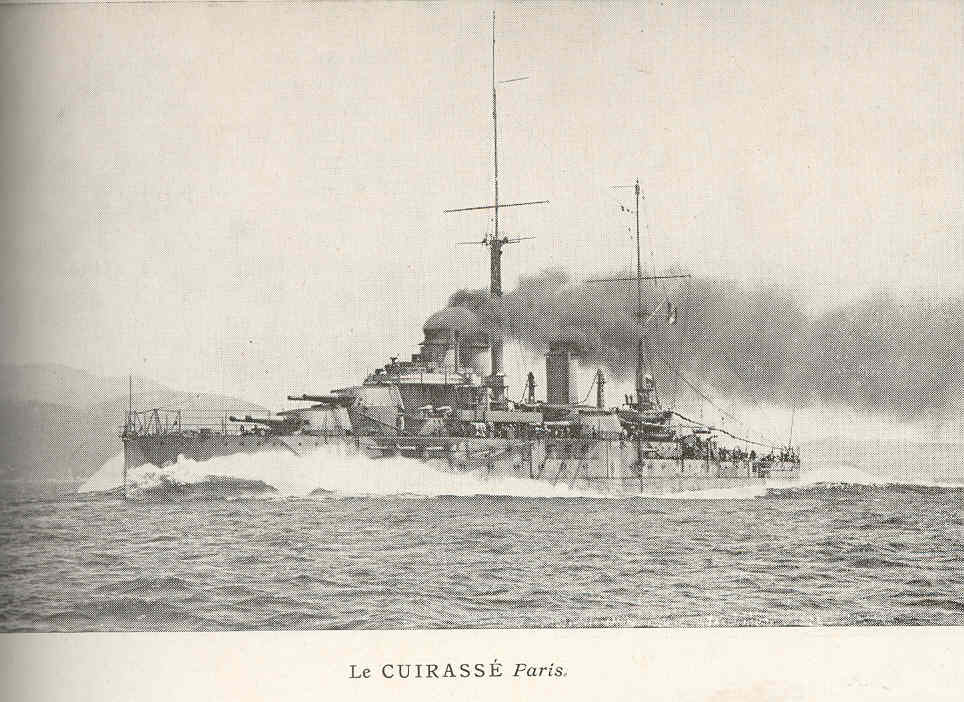
- Paris, 1913

History

France
- Name: Paris
- Namesake: Paris
- Ordered: 1 August 1911
- Builder: Forges et Chantiers de la Méditerranée, La Seyne
- Cost: F63,000,000
- Laid down: 10 November 1911
- Launched: 28 September 1912
- Completed: 22 August 1914
- Commissioned: 1 August 1914
- Stricken: 21 December 1955
- Fate: Scrapped, June 1956

General characteristics (as built)
- Class & type: Courbet-class battleship
- Displacement: 23,475 t (23,104 long tons) (normal); 25,579 t (25,175 long tons) (full load)
- Length: 166 m (544 ft 7 in) (o/a)
- Beam: 27 m (88 ft 7 in)
- Draught: 9.04 m (29 ft 8 in)
- Installed power: 28,000 PS (20,594 kW; 27,617 shp); 24 × Belleville boilers
- Propulsion: 4 × shafts; 2 × steam turbine sets
- Speed: 21 knots (39 km/h; 24 mph)
- Endurance: 4,200 nmi (7,800 km; 4,800 mi) at 10 knots (19 km/h; 12 mph)
- Complement: 1,115 (1,187 as flagship)
- Armament: 6 × twin 305 mm (12 in) guns; 22 × single 138 mm (5.4 in) guns; 4 × single 47 mm (1.9 in) guns; 4 × 450 mm (17.7 in) torpedo tubes
- Armour: Waterline belt: 140–250 mm (5.5–9.8 in); Deck: 40–70 mm (1.6–2.8 in); Turrets: 250 mm (9.8 in); Conning tower: 266 mm (10.5 in)

Paris was the third ship of four Courbet-class battleships, the first dreadnoughts built for the French Navy. She was completed before World War I as part of the 1911 naval building programme. She spent the war in the Mediterranean, spending most of 1914 providing gunfire support for the Montenegrin Army until her sister ship Jean Bart was torpedoed by the submarine U-12 on 21 December. She spent the rest of the war providing cover for the Otranto Barrage that blockaded the Austro-Hungarian Navy in the Adriatic Sea.

Paris supported French and Spanish troops in 1925 during the Third Rif War before becoming a school ship in 1931. She was modernized in three separate refits between the wars even though she was not deemed to be a first-class battleship. She remained in that role until the Battle of France, which began on 10 May 1940, after which she was hastily rearmed. She supported Allied troops in the defence of Le Havre during June until she was damaged by a German bomb, but she took refuge later that month in England. As part of Operation Catapult, she was seized in Plymouth by British forces on 3 July. She was used as a depot ship and barracks ship there by the Royal and Polish Navies for the rest of the war. Returned to the French in July 1945 she was towed to Brest the following month and used as a depot ship until she was stricken on 21 December 1955.

== Background and description ==
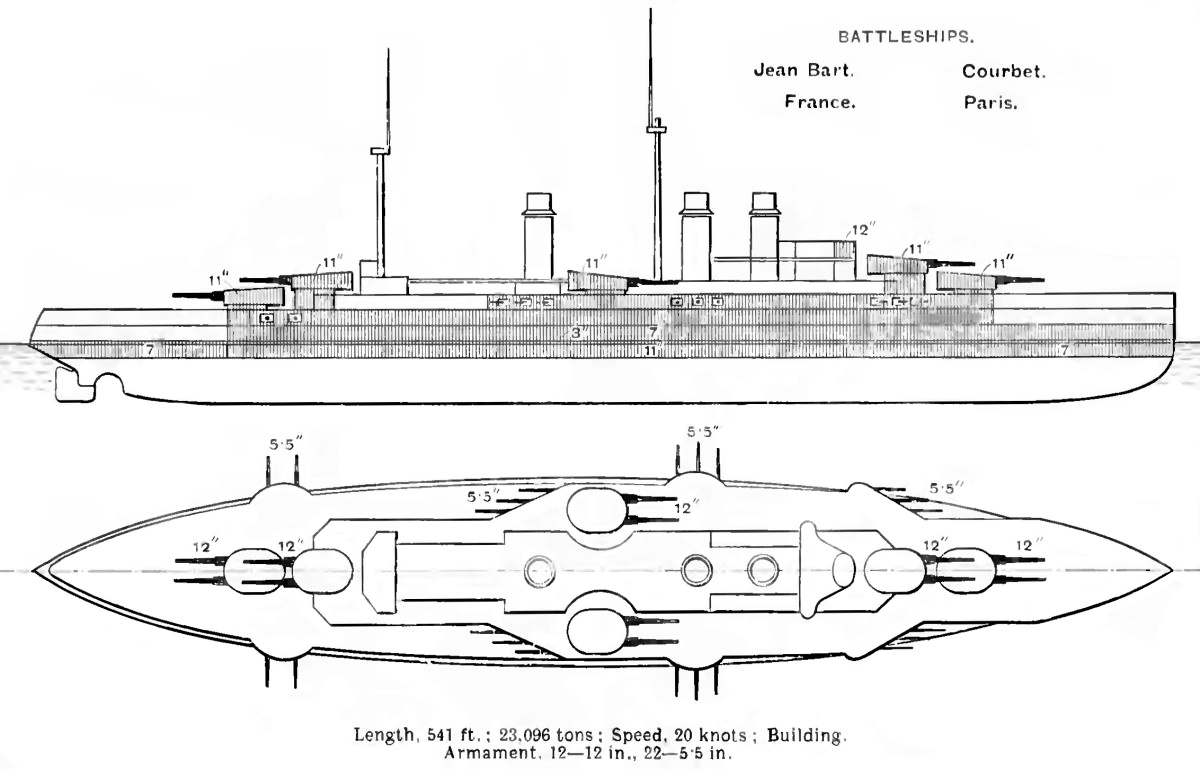
Right elevation and deck plan as depicted in Brassey's Naval Annual 1912

By 1909 the French Navy was finally convinced of the superiority of the all-big-gun battleship like HMS Dreadnought over the mixed-calibre designs like the Danton class which had preceded the Courbets. The following year, the new Minister of the Navy, Augustin Boué de Lapeyrère, selected a design that was comparable to the foreign dreadnoughts then under construction to be built as part of the 1906 Naval Programme.

The ships were 166 metres (544 ft 7 in) long overall and had a beam of 27 metres (88 ft 7 in) and a mean draught of 9.04 metres (29 ft 8 in). They displaced 23,475 tonnes (23,104 long tons) at normal load and 25,579 tonnes (25,175 long tons) at deep load. Their crew numbered 1,115 men as a private ship and increased to 1,187 when serving as a flagship. The ships were powered by two licence-built Parsons steam turbine sets, each driving two propeller shafts using steam provided by 24 Belleville boilers. These boilers were coal-burning with auxiliary oil sprayers and were designed to produce 28,000 metric horsepower (20,594 kW; 27,617 shp). The ships had a designed speed of 21 knots (39 km/h; 24 mph). The Courbet-class ships carried enough coal and fuel oil to give them a range 4,200 nautical miles (7,800 km; 4,800 mi) at a speed of 10 knots (19 km/h; 12 mph).

The main battery of the Courbet class consisted of twelve Canon de 305 mm (12 in) Modèle 1906–1910 guns mounted in six twin-gun turrets, with two pairs of superfiring turrets fore and aft of the superstructure, and a pair of wing turrets amidships. Their secondary armament was twenty-two Canon de 138 mm (5.4 in) Modèle 1910 guns, which were mounted in casemates in the hull. Four Canon de 47 mm (1.9 in) Modèle 1902 Hotchkiss guns were fitted, two on each broadside in the superstructure. They were also armed with four 450-millimetre (17.7 in) submerged torpedo tubes and could stow 10 mines below decks. The ships' waterline belt ranged in thickness from 140 to 250 mm (5.5 to 9.8 in) and was thickest amidships. The gun turrets were protected by 250 mm of armour and 160 mm (6.3 in) plates protected the casemates. The curved armoured deck was 40 mm (1.6 in) thick on the flat and 70 mm (2.8 in) on the outer slopes. The conning tower had a 266 mm (10.5 in) thick face and sides.

== Construction and career ==
The ship was ordered on 1 August 1911 and named after the French capital city. She was laid down on 10 November 1911 by Forges et Chantiers de la Méditerranée at its shipyard in La Seyne and launched on 28 September 1912. Due to the rising tensions in Europe in mid-1914, the ship was commissioned into the fleet on 1 August before she was formally completed on 14 August at a cost of F63,000,000. Paris was assigned to the 1st Division (1ère Division) of the 2nd Battle Squadron (2ème Escadre de ligne) of the 1st Naval Army (1ère Armée Navale) on 1 August, but did not join her squadron until 5 September.

After working up she was sent, along with her sisters, to the Mediterranean Sea. She spent most of the rest of 1914 providing gunfire support for the Montenegrin Army until U-12 hit Jean Bart on 21 December with a torpedo. This forced the battleships to fall back to either Malta or Bizerte to cover the Otranto Barrage. After the French occupied the neutral Greek island of Corfu in 1916 she moved forward to Corfu and Argostoli, but her activities were very limited as much of her crew was used to man anti-submarine ships. Before the end of the war she was fitted with seven 75-millimetre (3 in) Mle 1897 anti-aircraft (AA) guns in single mounts. These guns were adaptions of the famous French Mle 97 75-mm field gun.

=== Interwar years ===
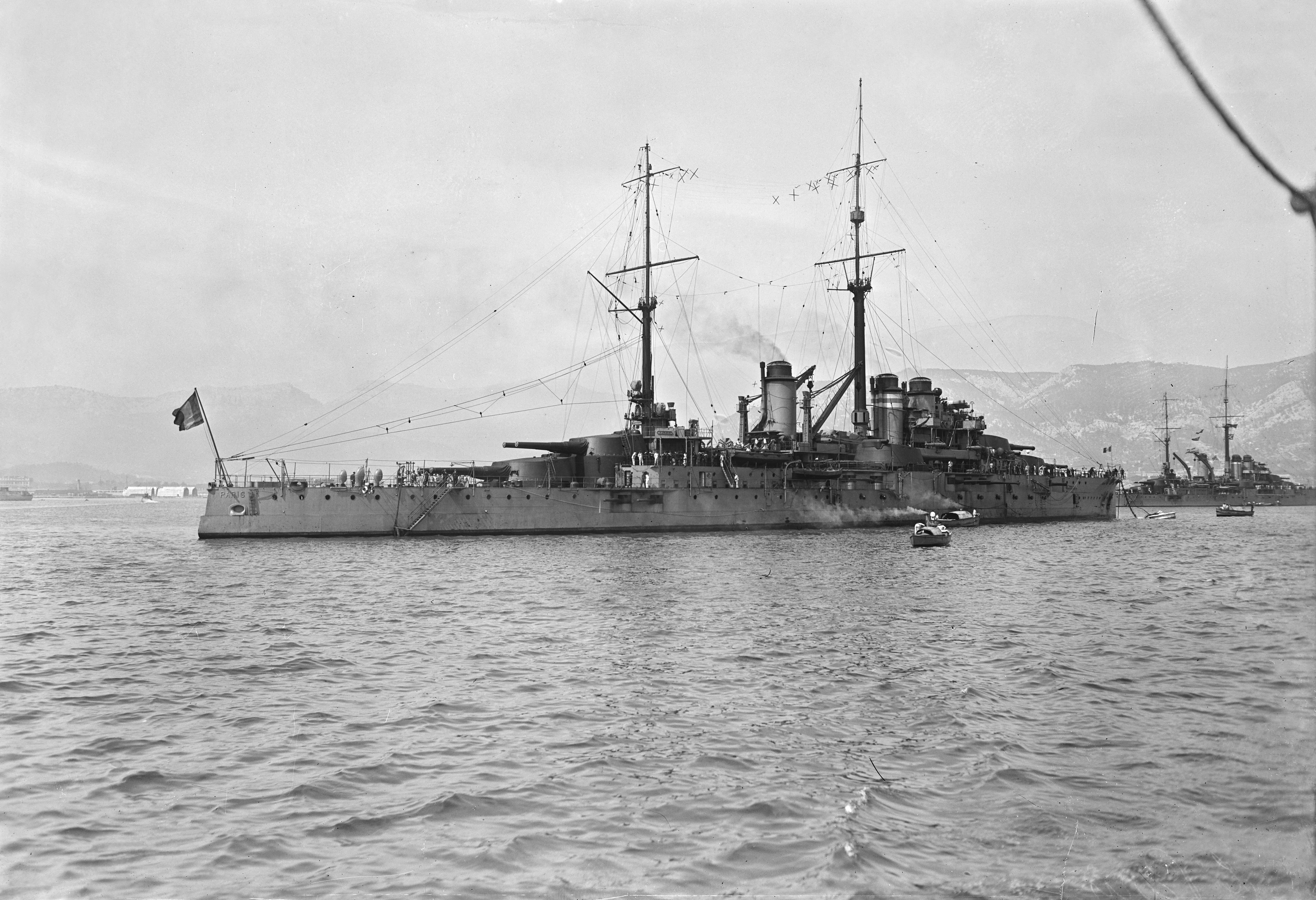
Paris en route to Toulon, 7 May 1922

Paris was sent to Pula on 12 December 1918 to supervise the surrendered Austro-Hungarian fleet, where she remained until 25 March 1919. She provided cover for Greek troops during the Occupation of İzmir (Smyrna) from May 1919 before returning to Toulon on 30 June 1919. She collided with the destroyer Bouclier at Toulon on 27 June 1922; both ships suffered severe damage.

Paris received the first of her upgrades at Brest between 25 October 1922 and 25 November 1923. This included replacing one set of boilers with oil-fired boilers, increasing the maximum elevation of the main armament from 12° to 23°, removal of her bow armour to make her less bow-heavy, the installation of a fire-control director, with a 4.57 metres (15.0 ft) rangefinder, and the exchange of her Mle 1897 AA guns for Mle 1918 guns. After her return to service she supported an amphibious landing at Al Hoceima by Spanish troops during the summer of 1925 after the Rifs attacked French Morocco during the Third Rif War. She destroyed coastal defence batteries there despite taking light damage from six hits and remained there until October as the flagship of the French forces. She was refitted again from 16 August 1927 to 15 January 1929 at Toulon and her fire-control systems were comprehensively upgraded. A large cruiser-type fire-control director was added atop the foremast with a 4.57-m coincidence rangefinder and a 3-metre (9 ft 10 in) stereo rangefinder. The rangefinder above the conning tower was replaced by a duplex unit carrying two 4.57-m rangefinders and another 4.57-m rangefinder was added in an armoured hood next to the main mast. Two directors for the secondary guns were added on the navigation bridge, each with a 2-metre (6 ft 7 in) coincidence rangefinder. A 8.2 metres (26 ft 11 in) rangefinder was added to the roof of 'B' turret, the second one from the bow. Three 1.5-metre (4 ft 11 in) rangefinders were provided for her anti-aircraft guns, one on top of the duplex unit on the conning tower, one on 'B' turret and one in the aft superstructure. She resumed her role as flagship of the 2nd Division of the 1st Squadron of the Mediterranean Squadron until 1 October 1931 when she became a training ship.

Paris was overhauled again between 1 July 1934 and 21 May 1935. Her boilers were overhauled, her main guns replaced and her Mle 1918 AA guns were exchanged for more modern Mle 1922 guns. They had a maximum depression of 10° and a maximum elevation of 90°. They fired a 5.93-kilogram (13.1 lb) shell at a muzzle velocity of 850 m/s (2,800 ft/s) at a rate of fire of 8–18 rounds per minute and had a maximum effective ceiling of 8,000 metres (26,000 ft).

=== World War II ===
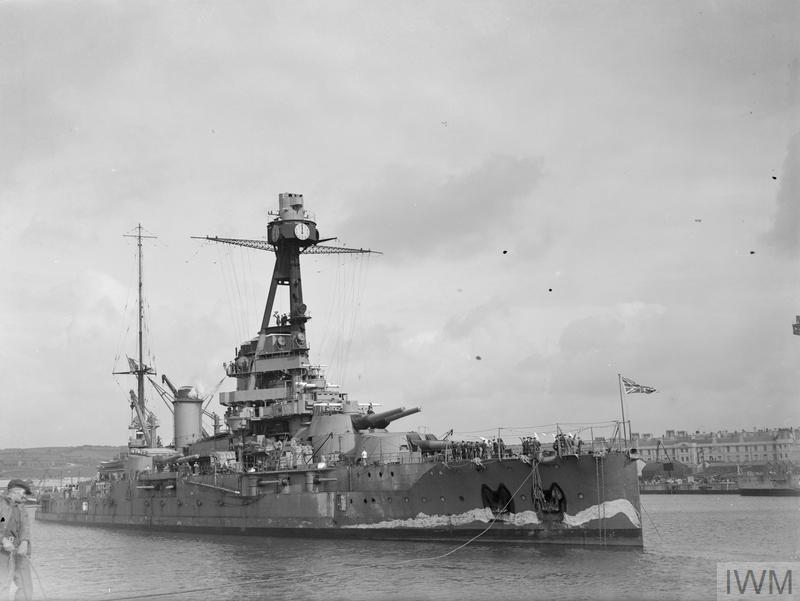
Paris leaving HM Dockyard, Devonport, July 1940

Paris and Courbet formed a Fifth Squadron at the beginning of the war. They were transferred to the Atlantic to continue their training duties without interference. Both ships were ordered restored to operational status on 21 May 1940 by Amiral Mord and they were given six Hotchkiss 13.2-millimetre (0.52 in) twin machine gun mounts and two single 13.2-mm Browning machine guns at Cherbourg. Paris was ordered to Le Havre on 6 June to provide gunfire support on the Somme front and covered the evacuation of the town by the Allies, although the lack of spotting aircraft meant that she was not particularly effective in that role. Instead she helped to defend the harbour of Le Havre against German aircraft until she was hit by a bomb on 11 June. She sailed for Cherbourg that night for temporary repairs despite taking on 300 long tons (305 t) of water per hour. She was transferred to Brest on 14 June and carried 2,800 men when that port was evacuated on 18 June.

In the wake of the Armistice, Paris was docked at Plymouth, England. On 3 July 1940, as part of Operation Catapult, British forces forcibly boarded her and she was used by the British as a depot ship and as a barracks ship by the Polish Navy for the rest of the war. On 21 August 1945, after the war had ended, Paris was towed to Brest where she continued in her role as a depot ship. She was sold for scrap on 21 December 1955 and broken up at La Seyne from June 1956.

== Bibliography ==
- Colledge, J. J. & Adams, T. A. (May 2022). "French Ships Seized by the Royal Navy During the Second World War — Part 2". Marine News Supplement: Warships. 76 (5): S261–S276. ISSN 0966-6958.
- Dodson, Aidan (2021). "Paris on the Tamar". In Jordan, John (ed.). Warship 2021. Oxford, UK: Osprey Publishing. pp. 188–190. ISBN 978-1-4728-4779-9.
- Dumas, Robert (1985). "The French Dreadnoughts: The 23,500 ton Courbet Class". In John Roberts (ed.). Warship. Vol. IX. Annapolis, Maryland: Naval Institute Press. pp. 154–164, 223–231. ISBN 978-0-87021-984-9. OCLC 26058427.
- Gille, Eric (1999). Cent ans de cuirassés français [A Century of French Battleships] (in French). Nantes: Marines. ISBN 2-909-675-50-5.
- Halpern, Paul G. (2004). The Battle of the Otranto Straits: Controlling the Gateway to the Adriatic in World War I. Bloomington, Indiana: Indiana University Press. ISBN 978-0-253-34379-6.
- Jordan, John & Caresse, Philippe (2017). French Battleships of World War One. Annapolis, Maryland: Naval Institute Press. ISBN 978-1-59114-639-1.
- Roberts, John (1980). "France". In Chesneau, Roger (ed.). Conway's All the World's Fighting Ships 1922–1946. New York: Mayflower Books. pp. 255–279. ISBN 0-8317-0303-2.
- Roche, Jean-Michel (2005). Dictionnaire des bâtiments de la flotte de guerre française de Colbert à nos jours [Dictionary of French Warships from Colbert to Today] (in French). Vol. Tome 1: 1671–1870. Toulon: Group Retozel-Maury Millau. OCLC 470444756.
- Smigielski, Adam (1985). "France". In Gray, Randal (ed.). Conway's All the World's Fighting Ships 1906–1921. Annapolis, Maryland: Naval Institute Press. pp. 190–220. ISBN 0-85177-245-5.
- Whitley, M. J. (1998). Battleships of World War Two: An International Encyclopedia. Annapolis, Maryland: Naval Institute Press. ISBN 1-55750-184-X.
