= Black Sea mutiny =

1919 French Navy mutiny

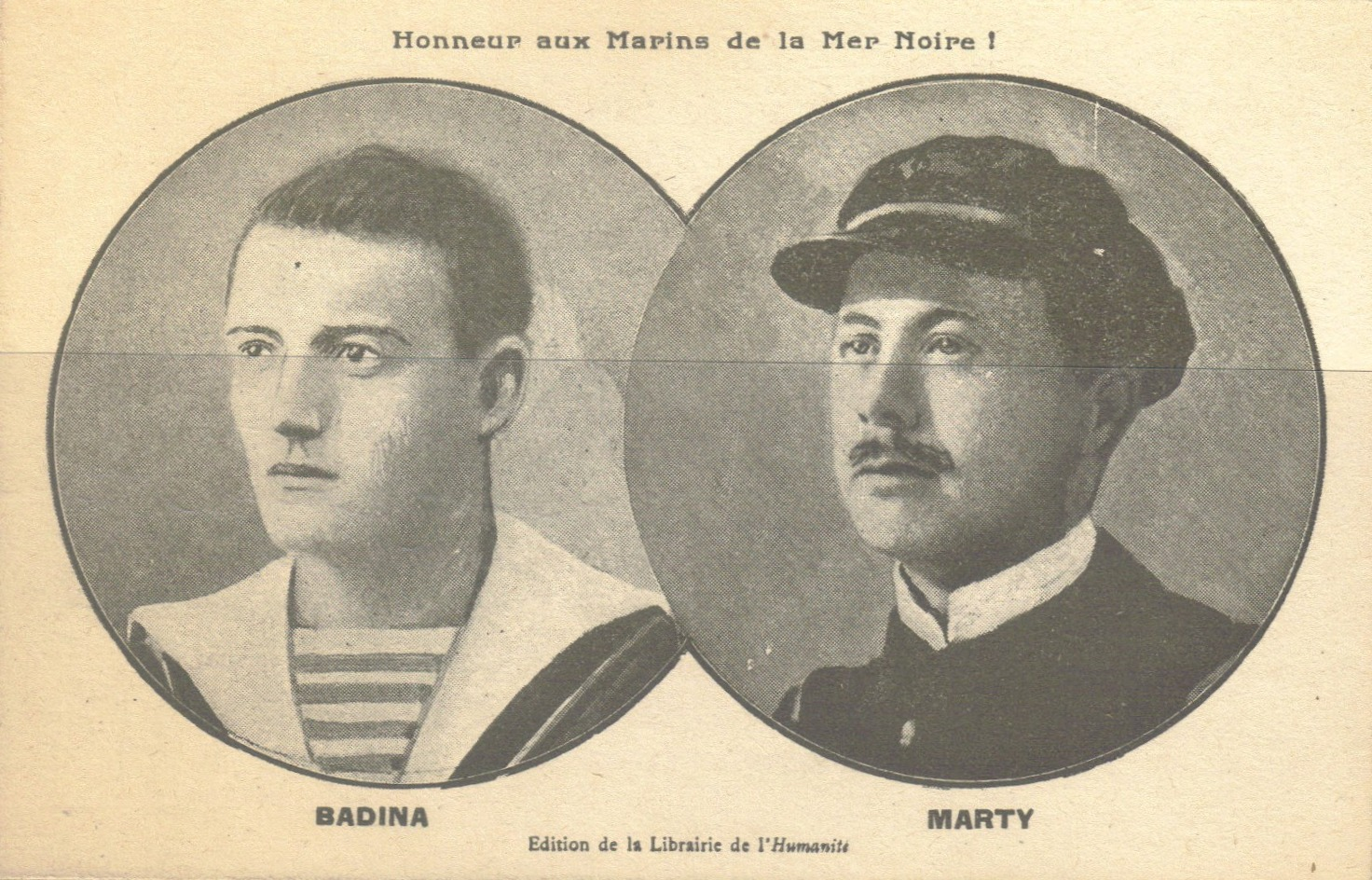

The Black Sea mutiny was a mutiny that took place aboard various ships of the French Navy — among others the battleships Jean Bart, France, and Provence — which had been dispatched to the Black Sea as part of the French-led Southern Russia intervention on the White Russian side. On April 19, 1919, the ships' crews mutinied in opposition to that French policy of intervention. Among the leaders of the mutiny was André Marty.

After the armistice of November 11, 1918, the dreadnought battleship Jean Bart was part of a squadron sent across the Black Sea toward Odessa to combat the Russian Revolution. The mutiny began on April 16, 1919, on board the destroyer Protet, as it lay anchored in the Danube River port of Galatz. One of the mutiny's supposed leaders, André Marty, was arrested the same day. Disobedience movements had emerged in February 1919. They were provoked by some combination of poor living conditions, the absence of demobilization following the armistice, and sympathy with the Russian revolutionaries. Marty had fomented a plot to take control of the protest movement and to enter the port of Odessa by waving a red flag, the symbol of the Bolshevik revolutionaries. A few hours after the first mutiny, the mutiny extended to the French naval vessels stationed in Crimea. On the morning of April 20, the red flag was raised on the two battleships (without lowering the French tricolor).

The mutiny spread on April 23 to the cruiser Waldeck-Rousseau. A court-martial held in Constantinople in July 1919 sentenced Marty to 20 years forced labor. In total, about 100 sailors were sentenced by French military tribunals although most were rapidly reprieved.
