= French battleship Courbet =

Courbet-class battleship

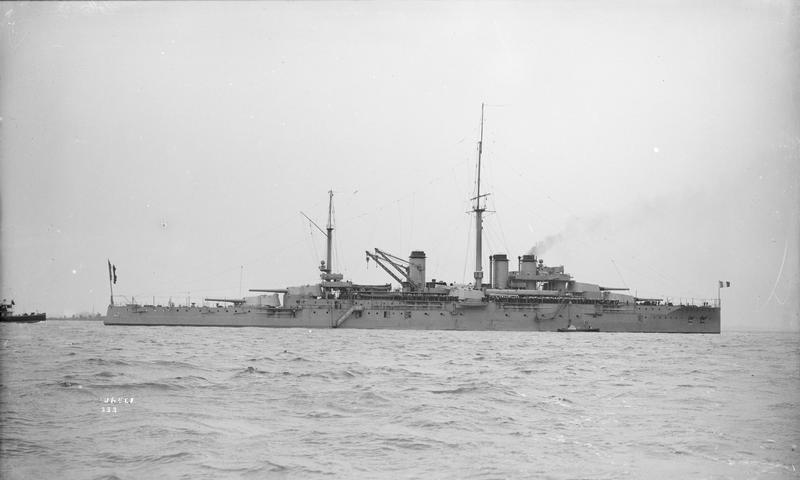
- Courbet before 1922

History

France
- Name: Courbet
- Namesake: Admiral Amédée Courbet
- Operator: French Navy; Free French Naval Forces
- Ordered: 11 August 1910
- Builder: Arsenal de Lorient
- Cost: F57,700,000
- Laid down: 1 September 1910
- Launched: 23 September 1911
- Completed: 8 October 1913
- Commissioned: 19 November 1913
- Fate: Scuttled, 9 June 1944, during Operation Neptune

General characteristics (as built)
- Class & type: Courbet-class battleship
- Displacement: 23,475 t (23,104 long tons) (normal); 25,579 t (25,175 long tons) (full load)
- Length: 166 m (544 ft 7 in) (o/a)
- Beam: 27 m (88 ft 7 in)
- Draught: 9.04 m (29 ft 8 in)
- Installed power: 28,000 PS (20,594 kW; 27,617 shp); 24 × Niclausse boilers
- Propulsion: 4 × shafts; 2 × steam turbine sets
- Speed: 21 knots (39 km/h; 24 mph)
- Endurance: 4,200 nmi (7,800 km; 4,800 mi) at 10 knots (19 km/h; 12 mph)
- Complement: 1,115 (1,187 as flagship)
- Armament: 6 × twin 305 mm (12 in) guns; 22 × single 138 mm (5.4 in) guns; 4 × single 47 mm (1.9 in) guns; 4 × 450 mm (17.7 in) torpedo tubes
- Armour: Waterline belt: 140–250 mm (5.5–9.8 in); Deck: 40–70 mm (1.6–2.8 in); Turrets: 250–360 mm (9.8–14.2 in); Conning tower: 266 mm (10.5 in)

Courbet was the lead ship of her class of four dreadnought battleships, the first ones built for the French Navy. She was completed shortly before the start of World War I in August 1914. She spent the war in the Mediterranean, where she helped to sink an Austro-Hungarian cruiser, covered the Otranto Barrage that blockaded the Austro-Hungarian Navy in the Adriatic Sea, and often served as a flagship. Although upgraded several times before World War II, she was not considered to be a first-line battleship by the 1930s and spent much of that decade as a gunnery training ship.

A few weeks after the German invasion of France on 10 May 1940, Courbet was hastily reactivated. She supported Allied troops in the defence of Cherbourg in mid-June, taking refuge in England shortly afterwards. As part of Operation Catapult, the ship was seized in Portsmouth by British forces on 3 July and was turned over to the Free French a week later. She was used as a stationary anti-aircraft battery and as an accommodation ship there. Courbet was disarmed in early 1941 and was used as a target ship during 1943. Her engines and boilers were removed in 1944 to prepare her for use as a breakwater during the Normandy landings (Operation Neptune) in June 1944. She was scrapped in situ after the war.

== Background and description ==
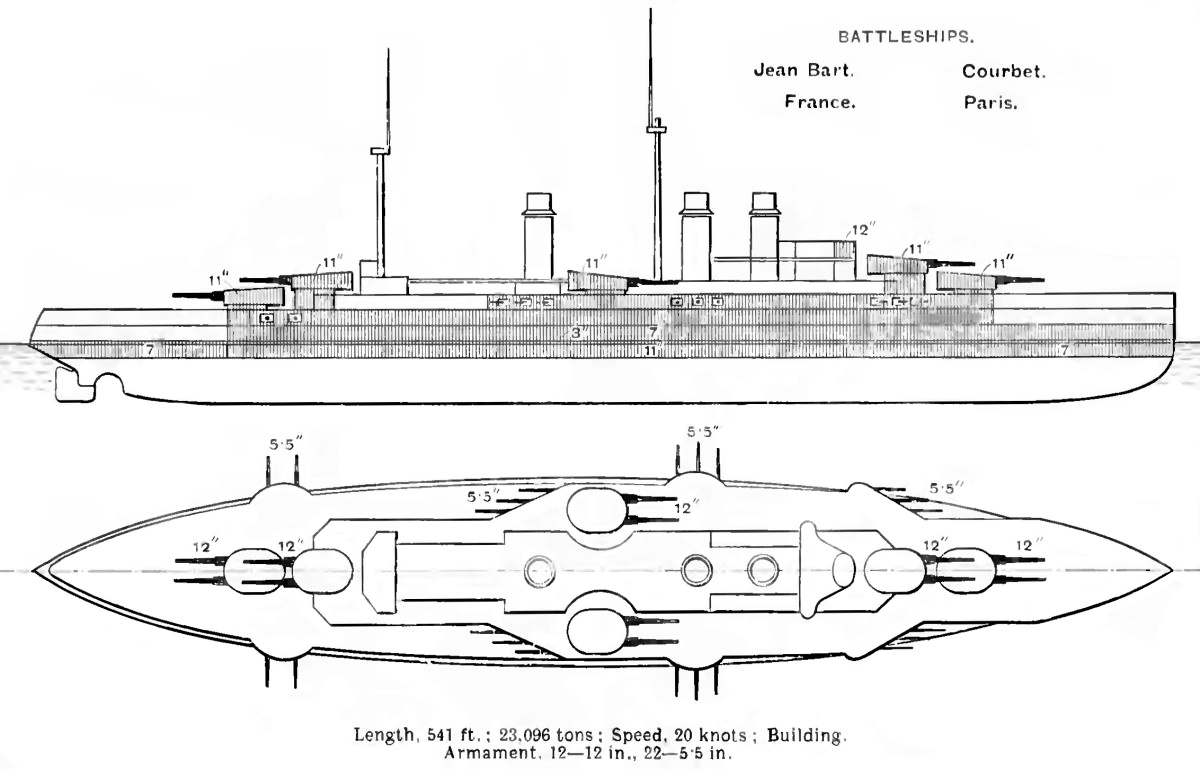
Right elevation and deck plan as depicted in Brassey's Naval Annual 1912

By 1909, the French Navy was convinced of the superiority of the all-big-gun battleship like HMS Dreadnought over mixed-calibre designs such as the Danton class, which preceded the Courbets. The following year, the new Minister of the Navy, Augustin Boué de Lapeyrère, selected a design that was comparable to the foreign dreadnoughts then under construction to be built as part of the 1906 Naval Programme.

The ships were 166 metres (544 ft 7 in) long overall and had a beam of 27 metres (88 ft 7 in) and a mean draught of 9.04 metres (29 ft 8 in). They displaced 23,475 tonnes (23,104 long tons) at normal load and 25,579 tonnes (25,175 long tons) at deep load. Their crew numbered 1,115 men as a private ship and 1,187 when serving as a flagship. The ships were powered by two licence-built Parsons steam turbine sets, each driving two propeller shafts. Unlike her sister ships, Courbet had 24 Niclausse boilers to provide steam for her turbines. These boilers were coal-burning with auxiliary oil sprayers and were designed to produce 28,000 metric horsepower (20,594 kW; 27,617 shp). The ships had a designed speed of 21 knots (39 km/h; 24 mph), although Courbet only reached 20.8 knots (38.5 km/h; 23.9 mph) during her sea trials. The Courbet-class ships carried enough coal and fuel oil to give them a range of 4,200 nautical miles (7,800 km; 4,800 mi) at a speed of 10 knots (19 km/h; 12 mph).

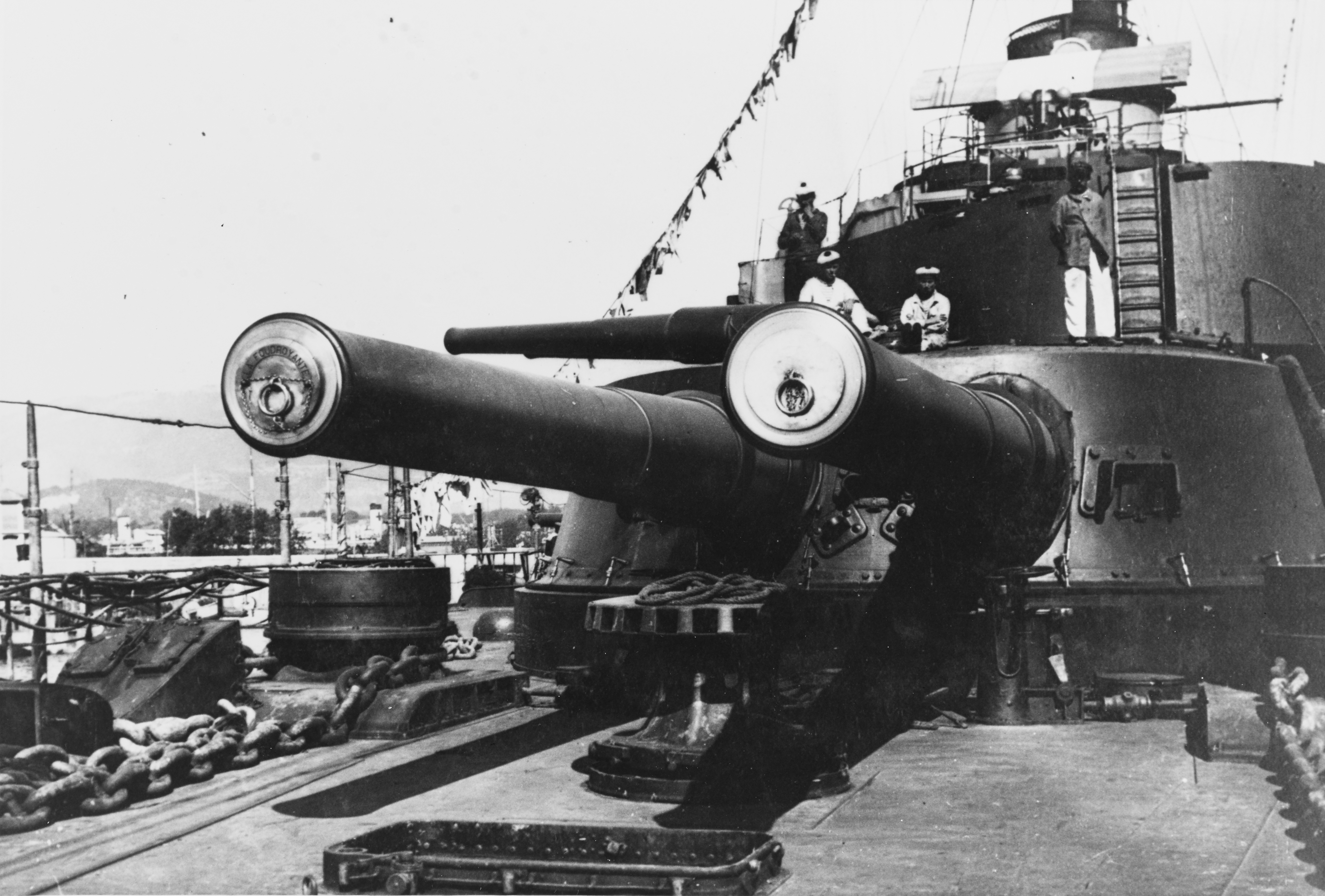
Courbet's forward gun turrets, about 1919

The main battery of the Courbet class consisted of twelve Canon de 305-millimetre (12 in) mle 1906–1910 guns mounted in six twin-gun turrets, with two pairs of superfiring turrets fore and aft of the superstructure, and a pair of wing turrets amidships. Their secondary armament was twenty-two Canon de 138.6-millimetre (5.5 in) mle 1910, which were mounted singly in casemates in the hull. Four Canon de 47-millimetre (1.9 in) mle 1902 Hotchkiss guns were fitted, two on each broadside in the superstructure. They were also armed with four 450-millimetre (17.7 in) submerged torpedo tubes, a pair on each broadside, and could stow 10 mines below decks. The ships' waterline belt ranged in thickness from 140 to 250 mm (5.5 to 9.8 in) and was thickest amidships. The gun turrets were protected by 250–360 millimetres (9.8–14.2 in) of armour and 160-millimetre (6.3 in) plates protected the casemates. The curved armoured deck was 40 mm (1.6 in) thick on the flat and 70 mm (2.8 in) on the outer slopes. The conning tower had 266 mm (10.5 in) thick face and sides.

== Construction and career ==
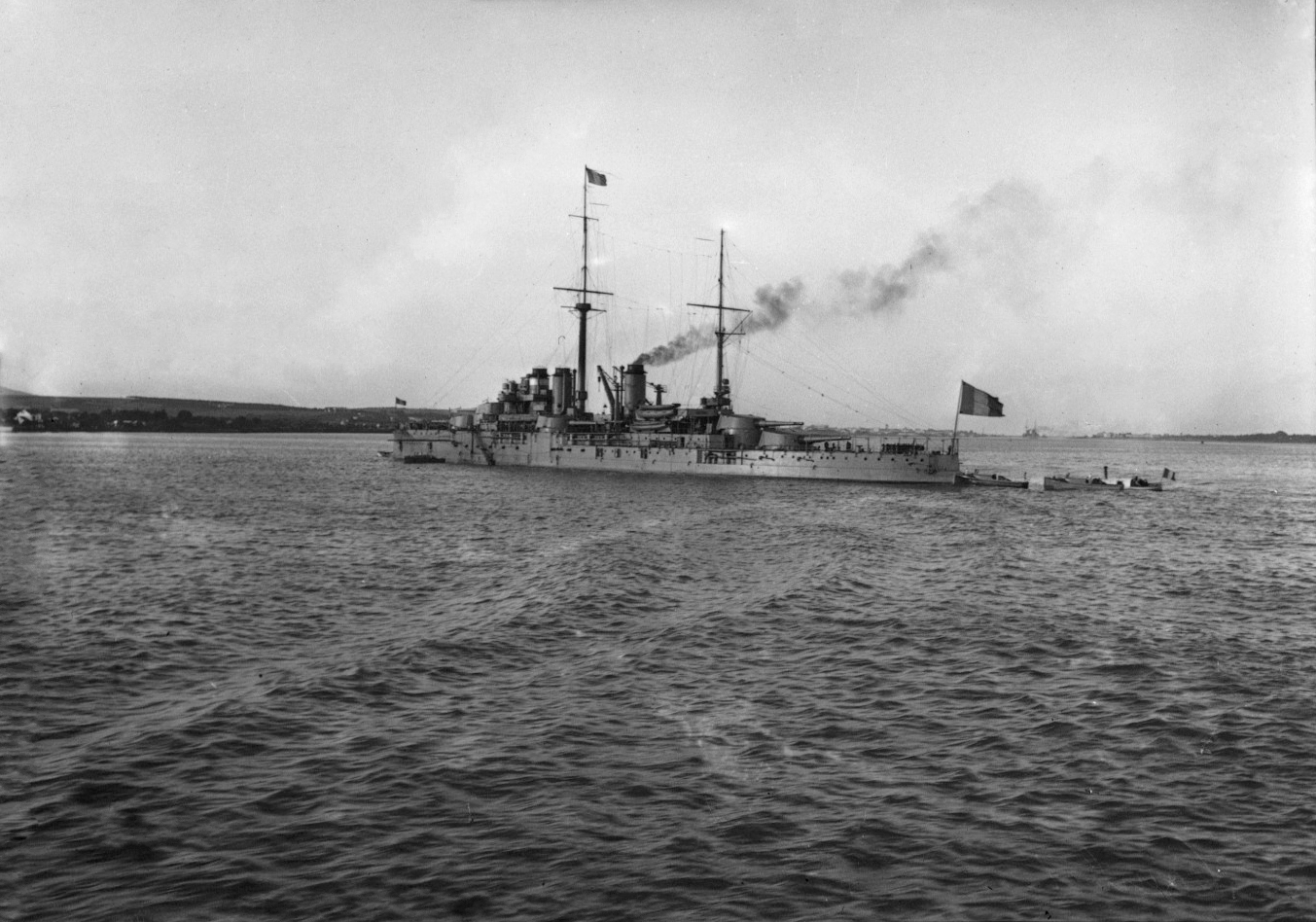
Courbet at anchor, 1914

Courbet was ordered on 11 August 1910 and named after Admiral Amédée Courbet. She was laid down on 1 September 1910 at the Arsenal de Lorient and launched on 23 September 1911. Shortly after finishing her machinery trials, she ferried the President of France, Raymond Poincaré, to Britain for a short visit on 24–26 June 1913. Courbet was completed on 8 October at a cost of F57,700,000 and was commissioned into the fleet on 19 November. Courbet and her sister Jean Bart were assigned to the 1st Battle Division (1ère Division de ligne) of the 1st Battle Squadron (1^{ère} Escadre de ligne) of the 1st Naval Army (^{1ère} Armée Navale), at Toulon in mid-November and Courbet became the flagship of Vice-Admiral (Vice-amiral) Augustin Boué de Lapeyrère, commander of the 1st Battle Squadron, on 5 January 1914.

=== World War I ===
By the time that France declared war on Germany on 2 August, Courbet had been relieved of her assignment to the 1st Division because Boué de Lapeyrère had become commander of the 1st Naval Army and the ship was now the fleet flagship. Since the whereabouts of the German battlecruiser SMS Goeben was unknown, he split his forces into three groups to cover the movements of troop convoys between French North Africa and metropolitan France. He accompanied the 2nd Battle Squadron (Group B) to Bougie, French Algeria, in Courbet before rendezvousing with her sisters Jean Bart and France off Valencia, Spain, to escort them to Toulon because the guns of the former were malfunctioning and the latter was so new that she did not have any ammunition aboard. On 7 August, Courbet and the battleship Condorcet took over the escort of a convoy from Algiers and then re-coaled in Toulon.

When France declared war on Austria-Hungary on 12 August, Boué de Lapeyrère decided on a sortie into the Adriatic intended to force the Austro-Hungarian fleet to give battle. After rendezvousing with a small British force on the 15th, he ordered his forces to split with the battleships headed for Otranto, Italy, while the armoured cruisers patrolled off the Albanian coast. Before the two groups got very far apart, several Austro-Hungarian ships were spotted on 16 August, and the Allied fleet was successful in cutting off and sinking the protected cruiser SMS Zenta off Antivari; the destroyer SMS Ulan managed to escape. The following day, Boué de Lapeyrère transferred his flag to Jean Bart. On 1 September, the 1st Naval Army briefly bombarded Austro-Hungarian coastal fortifications defending the Bay of Cattaro to discharge the unfired shells remaining in the guns after sinking Zenta. Aside from several uneventful sorties into the Adriatic, the French capital ships spent most of their time cruising between the Greek and Italian coasts to prevent the Austro-Hungarian fleet from attempting to break out of the Adriatic. The torpedoing of Jean Bart on 21 December by the Austro-Hungarian submarine U-12 showed that the battleships were vulnerable to this threat, and they were withdrawn to spend the rest of the month further south at an anchorage in Navarino Bay.

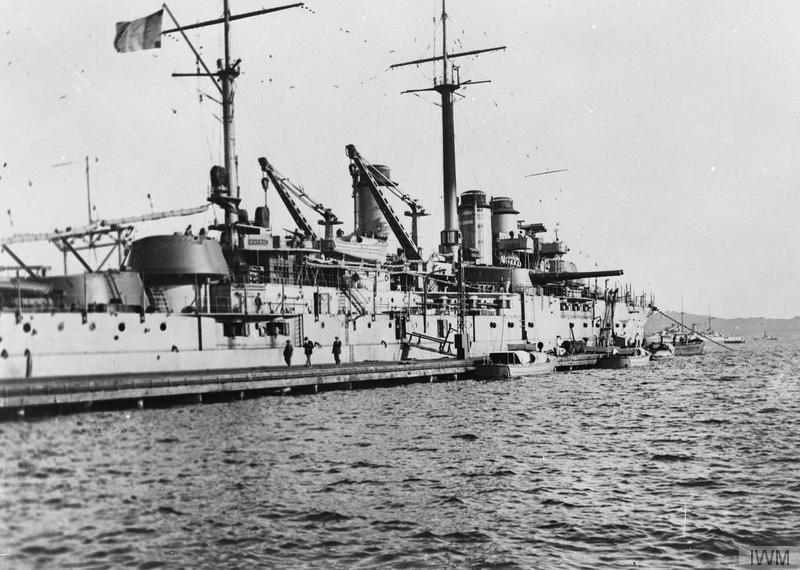
Courbet at anchor in Toulon harbour, 24 September 1916

On 11 January 1915, the French were alerted that the Austro-Hungarian fleet was going to sortie from its base at Pola, so Courbet, Paris and France led the Naval Army north to the Albanian coast. It proved to be a false alarm, and they were back at their moorings three days later. In the meantime, the ships patrolled the Ionian Sea. The Italian declaration of war on Austria-Hungary on 23 May, and the Italian decision to assume responsibility for naval operations in the Adriatic, allowed the French Navy to withdraw to either Malta or Bizerte, French Tunisia, to cover the Otranto Barrage. At some point during the year, Courbet's 47 mm guns were put on high-angle mountings to allow them to be used as anti-aircraft (AA) guns. They were later supplemented by a pair of 75 mm (3 in) Mle 1891 G guns on anti-aircraft mounts. On 27 April 1916, the French began using the port of Argostoli on the Greek island of Cephalonia as a base. Around this time, many men from the battleships' crews were transferred to anti-submarine ships. At the beginning of 1917, the French began to use the Greek island of Corfu as well, but shortages of coal severely limited the battleships' ability to go to sea. In 1918, they were almost immobile, leaving Corfu only for maintenance and repairs. On 1 July, the Naval Army was reorganised with Courbet, Paris and Jean Bart assigned to the 2nd Battle Division of the 1st Battle Squadron. At some point during the year, Courbet's mainmast was shortened and a motorised winch was installed to allow her to operate a kite balloon, but this was not a success.

=== Interwar years ===
After the war ended on 11 November, Courbet returned to Toulon for a refit; the ship was briefly placed in reserve before she became Vice-Admiral Charlier's flagship between 6 June 1919 and 20 October 1920. On 10 February 1920, the 1st Naval Army was disbanded and replaced by the Eastern Mediterranean Squadron (Escadre de la Méditerranée orientale) and its Western counterpart (Escadre de la Méditerranée occidentale); all of the Courbets assigned to the 1st Battle Squadron of the latter unit, with Courbet, Jean Bart and Paris in the 1st Battle Division and France in the 2nd Battle Division. Charlier commanded both the 1st Division and the Western Mediterranean Squadron at this time. The two squadrons were combined into the Mediterranean Squadron (Escadre de la Méditerranée) on 20 July 1921.

The following year, she became a gunnery training ship at Toulon, but she suffered a serious boiler fire on 6 June 1923 that required repairs, so she was given the first of her modernisations between 9 July 1923 and 16 April 1924, at La Seyne-sur-Mer. This included replacing four boilers with oil-fired du Temple boilers and trunking together her two forward funnels. The maximum elevation of the main armament was increased from 12° to 23° which increased their maximum range to 26,000 metres (28,000 yd). Her existing AA guns were replaced with four 75 mm Modèle 1918 AA guns, and her bow armour was removed to make her more seaworthy. A new tripod foremast with a fire-control position at its top was fitted. A Barr & Stroud 4.57-metre (15 ft) rangefinder was positioned on the roof of the fire-control position and an experimental Barr & Stroud FX2 7.6-metre (24 ft 11 in) coincidence rangefinder was installed on the roof of the aft superfiring turret, replacing the 2-metre (6 ft 7 in) instrument inside the turret. She had another boiler fire on 1 August 1924, burning 13 men, of whom 3 later died of their wounds, and remained under repair for the rest of the year.

Courbet and the battleship Provence visited Naples, Italy, on 15–19 June 1925 then rendezvoused with Jean Bart and Paris at Mers-el-Kebir, French Algeria, for manoeuvres in the Bay of Biscay with the Atlantic-based ships that began on the 26th. Afterwards, the assembled ships were reviewed by the President of France, Gaston Doumergue at Cherbourg, and the Mediterranean-based ships returned to Toulon on 12 August. On 1 January 1927, the Mediterranean Squadron was renamed the 1st Squadron. Two weeks later, Courbet began a lengthy modernisation that lasted until 12 January 1931.

This was much more extensive than her earlier refit as all of her boilers were replaced or overhauled: she received six oil-fired du Temple boilers that had been built for the scrapped battleship Normandie and sixteen coal-fired boilers from Normandie's sister Flandre. The ship was only able to reach 18.2 knots (33.7 km/h; 20.9 mph) at a displacement of 24,748 tonnes (24,357 long tons) during her sea trials afterwards. Courbet's fire-control systems were comprehensively upgraded with the installation of a Saint-Chamond-Granat system in a director-control tower (DCT) on the top of the tripod mast, and all of her original rangefinders were replaced with the exception of the 2-metre (6 ft 7 in) rangefinders in each turret. The DCT was fitted with a 4.57-metre coincidence rangefinder, and a 3-metre (9 ft 10 in) stereo rangefinder was added to the DCT to measure the distance between the target and shell splashes. Additional 4.57-metre rangefinders were added in a duplex mounting atop the conning tower and another at the base of the mainmast. The Barr & Stroud 7.6-metre instrument was removed, and a traversable 8.2-metre (26 ft 11 in) rangefinder was fitted to the roof of the forward superfiring turret. Directors with 2-metre rangefinders were also added to control the secondary guns. The ship's Mle 1918 AA guns were exchanged for seven Canon de 75 mm modèle 1922 guns, and they were provided with a pair of high-angle 1.5-metre (4 ft 11 in) rangefinders, one on top of the duplex unit on the conning tower and one in the aft superstructure.

On 25 March 1931, Courbet had a breakdown in one of her turbines and had to return to the shipyard for repairs. After running her sea trials on 9–12 June, she was assigned to the Training Division as part of the gunnery school. The ship conducted several gunnery exercises from 4 February to 27 May 1932 before she returned to the shipyard to have her condensers retubed and her two inner propellers replaced. In 1933 and 1934, Courbet and her sister Paris, both assigned to the Training Division, rarely left port. Courbet had her propulsion machinery overhauled in 1937–1938, and the navy took the opportunity to remove her torpedo tubes and reinforce her anti-aircraft armament with the addition of a few Hotchkiss 13.2-millimetre (0.5 in) anti-aircraft machineguns. The Training Squadron was disbanded on 10 June 1939, and the sisters were assigned to the 3rd Battle Division of the 5th Squadron. The ships began a cruise on 14 June during which they visited Mers-el-Kebir and Casablanca, French Morocco, before arriving in Brest on 11 July where the division was assigned to the 2nd Maritime Region which was headquartered there, retaining their role as gunnery training ships.

=== World War II ===
From the beginning of World War II in September 1939, Courbet and Paris continued training until after the German invasion of France on 10 May 1940. They were mobilised on 21 May with augmented crews and assigned to the command of Vice-Admiral Jean-Marie Abrial for the defence of the French ports on the English Channel. Courbet provided gunfire support to the defenders of Cherbourg on 19 June against the advancing 7th Panzer Division and then covered the evacuation of the town by the Allies during Operation Aerial. The ship sailed for Portsmouth, England, the following day.

Courbet was seized there, as part of Operation Catapult, by British forces on 3 July to prevent French ships from falling into German hands after the French surrender in late June. The ship was given to the Free French a week later, who used her as an anti-aircraft battery in Portsmouth, until she was disarmed on 31 March 1941, and used as an accommodation ship. At Loch Striven, Scotland, she was used as a target for the "Highball" bouncing bomb trials between 9 May and December 1943. "Highball" was a smaller version of "Upkeep" used in Operation Chastise, also known as the Dambuster Raid. Courbet remained in use as a depot and target ship until she was earmarked for use as a "Gooseberry" breakwater at Sword Beach during the Normandy landings. The ship had to be towed from Weymouth on 7 June by a pair of British tugboats as her engines and boilers had been removed earlier and replaced with concrete. She was scuttled on 9 June off Sword Beach and was hit by Neger manned torpedoes during the nights of 15–16 and 16–17 August. As such, she was probably the only ship ever attacked by secret weapons of both sides during the conflict. She was slowly scrapped in place after the war; the demolition was completed in 1970.

== Bibliography ==
- Dumas, Robert (1985). "The French Dreadnoughts: The 23,500 ton Courbet Class". In John Roberts (ed.). Warship. Vol. IX. Annapolis, Maryland: Naval Institute Press. pp. 154–164, 223–231. ISBN 0-87021-984-7. OCLC 26058427.
- Halpern, Paul G. (2004). The Battle of the Otranto Straits: Controlling the Gateway to the Adriatic in World War I. Bloomington, Indiana: Indiana University Press. ISBN 978-0-253-34379-6.
- Jordan, John & Caresse, Philippe (2017). French Battleships of World War One. Annapolis, Maryland: Naval Institute Press. ISBN 978-1-59114-639-1.
- Murray, Iain (2009). Bouncing-Bomb Man: The Science of Sir Barnes Wallis. Yeovil, UK: Haynes Publishing. ISBN 978-1-84425-588-7.
- Rohwer, Jürgen (2005). Chronology of the War at Sea 1939–1945: The Naval History of World War Two (Third Revised ed.). Annapolis, Maryland: Naval Institute Press. ISBN 1-59114-119-2.
- Silverstone, Paul H. (1984). Directory of the World's Capital Ships. New York: Hippocrene Books. ISBN 0-88254-979-0.
- Whitley, M. J. (1998). Battleships of World War Two: An International Encyclopedia. Annapolis, Maryland: Naval Institute Press. ISBN 1-55750-184-X.
