= Stuckange =

- Commune
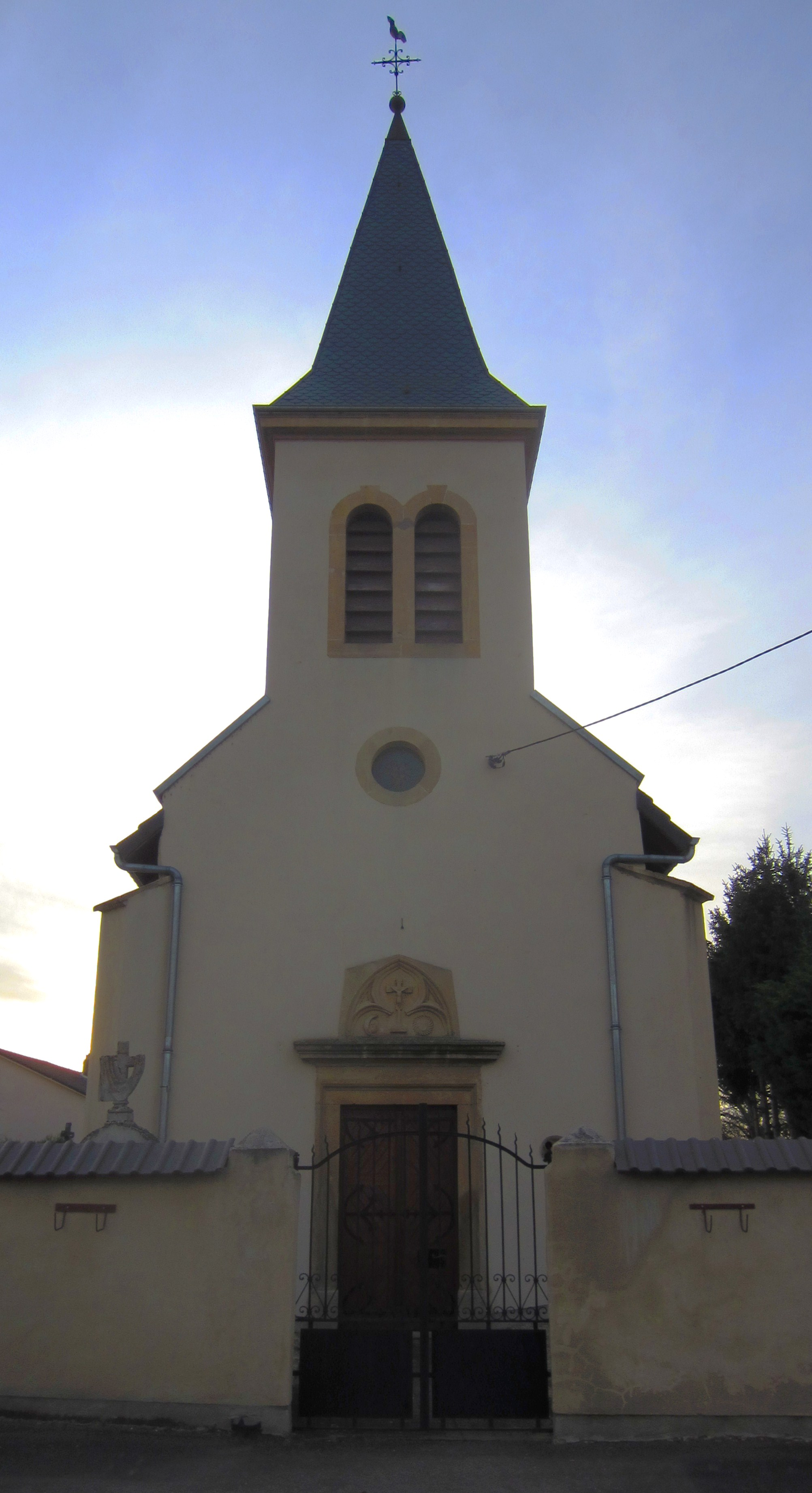
- The chapel in Stuckange

- Coat of arms
- Location of Stuckange
- Location within France Location within Grand Est
- Coordinates: 49°19′37″N 6°14′26″E
- Country: France
- Region: Grand Est
- Department: Moselle
- Arrondissement: Thionville
- Canton: Metzervisse
- Intercommunality: CC de l'Arc Mosellan

Government
  - Mayor (2020–2026): Olivier Segura
- Area^{1}: 4.44 km^{2} (1.71 sq mi)
- Elevation: 150 m (490 ft)
- Highest elevation: 210 m (690 ft)
- Lowest elevation: 172 m (564 ft)
- Population (2023): 1,515
  - Density: 341/km^{2} (884/sq mi)
- Time zone: UTC+01:00 (CET)
  - Summer (DST): UTC+02:00 (CEST)
- INSEE/Postal code: 57767 /57970
- ^{1} French Land Register data, which excludes lakes, ponds, glaciers > 1 km^{2} (0.386 sq mi or 247 acres) and river estuaries.

Stuckange (French pronunciation: [stykɑ̃ʒ]; German: Stückingen; Lorraine Franconian: Stickéng/Stëckéng) is a commune in the Moselle department in Grand Est in north-eastern France. It was created in 1988 from part of the commune Kuntzig.

== See also ==
- Communes of the Moselle department
