= Kuntzig =

- Commune
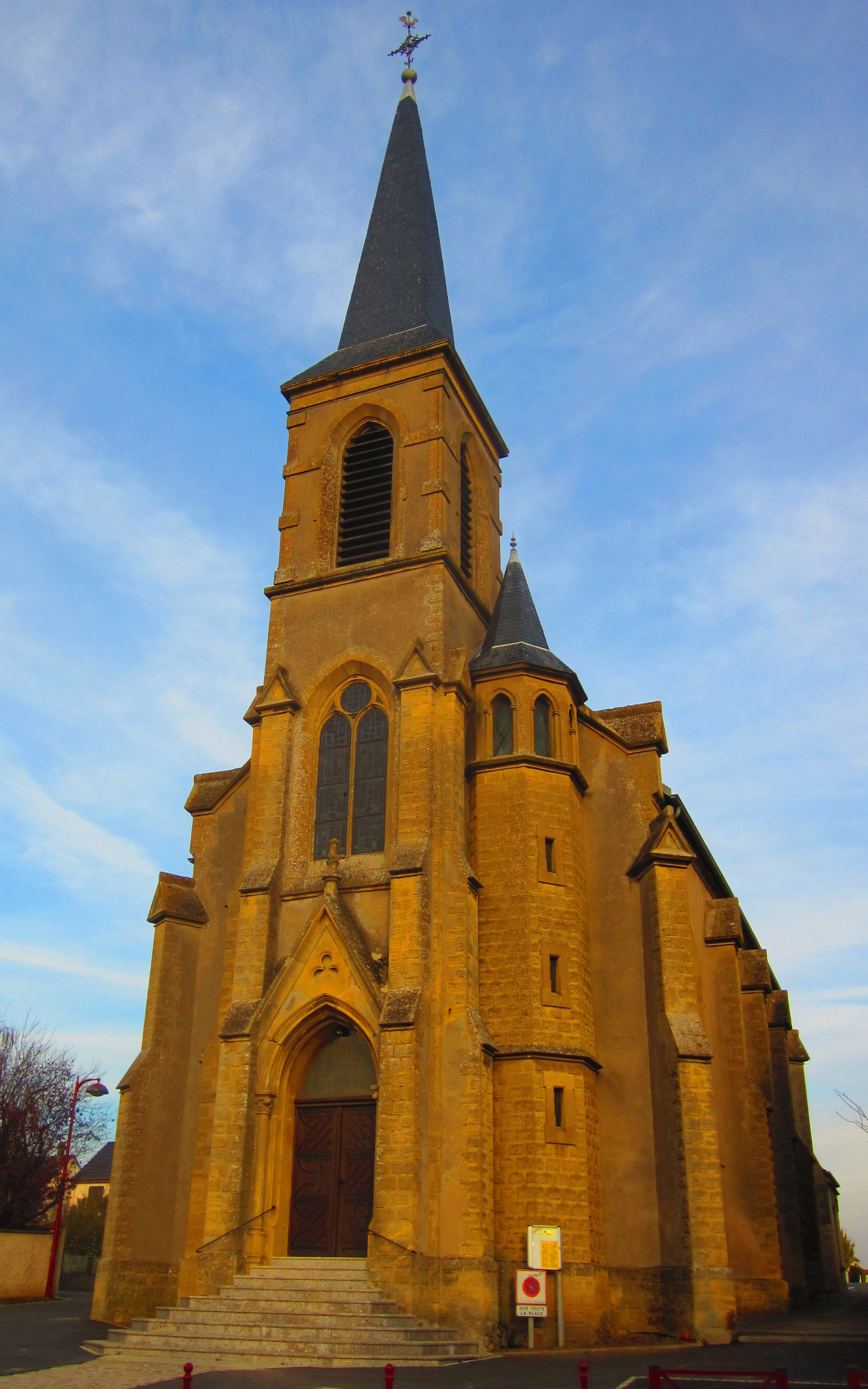
- The church in Kuntzig

- Coat of arms
- Location of Kuntzig
- Location within France Location within Grand Est
- Coordinates: 49°20′49″N 6°14′29″E
- Country: France
- Region: Grand Est
- Department: Moselle
- Arrondissement: Thionville
- Canton: Metzervisse
- Intercommunality: CA Portes de France-Thionville

Government
  - Mayor (2020–2026): Patrick Becker
- Area^{1}: 4.51 km^{2} (1.74 sq mi)
- Elevation: 150 m (490 ft)
- Highest elevation: 200 m (660 ft)
- Lowest elevation: 161 m (528 ft)
- Population (2023): 1,359
  - Density: 301/km^{2} (780/sq mi)
- Time zone: UTC+01:00 (CET)
  - Summer (DST): UTC+02:00 (CEST)
- INSEE/Postal code: 57372 /57970
- ^{1} French Land Register data, which excludes lakes, ponds, glaciers > 1 km^{2} (0.386 sq mi or 247 acres) and river estuaries.

Kuntzig (French pronunciation: [kyntsiʃ]; German: Künzig; Lorraine Franconian: Kënzech/Kënzeg) is a commune in the Moselle department in Grand Est in north-eastern France. In 1988 it ceded part of its territory to the new commune of Stuckange.

== Population ==
The population data in the table below refer to the commune of Kuntzig in its geography at the given years.

Historical population

Year	Pop.	±% p.a.
1946	668	—
1954	808	+2.41%
1962	1,251	+5.62%
1975	1,459	+1.19%
1982	1,690	+2.12%
1990	1,088	−5.36%

Year	Pop.	±% p.a.
1999	1,059	−0.30%
2007	1,056	−0.04%
2012	1,245	+3.35%
2017	1,314	+1.08%
2023	1,359	+0.56%

Source: EHESS and INSEE (1990-2023)

== See also ==
- Communes of the Moselle department
