= 305mm/45 Modèle 1906 gun =

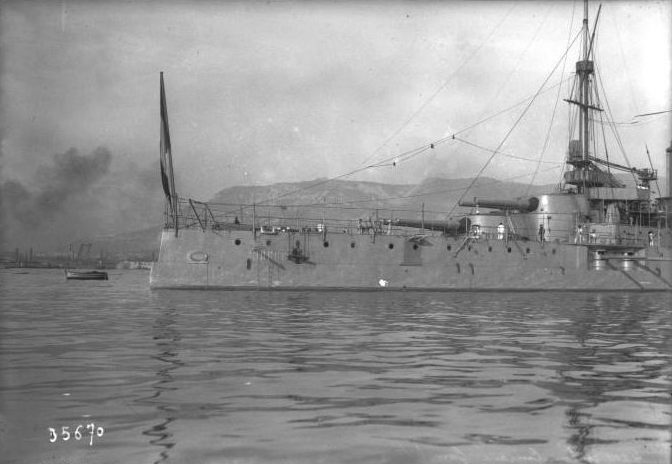
- Main guns of the Courbet
- Type: Naval gun
- Place of origin: France

Service history
- Used by: French Navy
- Wars: World War I World War II

Specifications
- Mass: 54.65 metric tons (53.79 long tons)
- Barrel length: 12.775 meters (41 ft 11.0 in)
- Shell: Separate charges
- Shell weight: 440 kilograms (970 lb)
- Caliber: 305 millimeters (12.0 in)
- Breech: 1906: Manz interrupted screw 1910: Welin interrupted screw
- Rate of fire: 1.5 rounds per minute
- Muzzle velocity: 780 meters per second (2,600 ft/s)
- Maximum firing range: 14,500 meters (15,900 yd) at +12°

The 305mm/45 Modèle 1906 gun was a heavy naval gun of the French Navy.

The type was used on the Danton-class battleship, mounted in two twin turrets. An improved version, the 305mm/45 Modèle 1910 gun, was installed on the Courbet class. Six surplus guns were modified to become railway guns and designated Canon de 305 modèle 1906/10 à glissement at the end of World War I, and, although too late to see action in that war, they were used during the Second World War.

== See also ==
=== Weapons of comparable role, performance and era ===
- BL 12 inch Mk X naval gun Vickers (British) equivalent
- 12"/45 caliber Mark 5 gun US equivalent

== Bibliography ==
- Friedman, Norman (2011). Naval Weapons of World War One. Barnsley, South Yorkshire, UK: Seaforth. ISBN 978-1-84832-100-7.
- Jordan, John (2013). "The 'Semi-Dreadnoughts' of the Danton Class". In Jordan, John (ed.). Warship 2013. London: Conway. pp. 46–66. ISBN 978-1-84486-205-4.
