= Canon de 340 modèle 1912 à glissement =

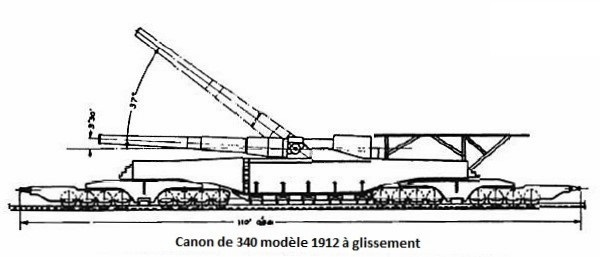
- A line diagram of a mle 1912 showing carriage details.
- Type: Railway gun
- Place of origin: France

Service history
- In service: 1918 – 1945
- Used by: France; Nazi Germany
- Wars: World War I World War II

Production history
- Designer: Schneider
- Designed: 1917
- Manufacturer: Schneider
- Produced: 1918 – 1919
- No. built: 6

Specifications
- Mass: 270 t (270 long tons; 300 short tons)
- Length: 33.6 m (110 ft)
- Barrel length: 15.3 m (50 ft) L/45
- Shell: Separate loading bagged charges and projectiles
- Caliber: 34 cm (13.4 in)
- Breech: Interrupted screw breech
- Recoil: Carriage recoil
- Carriage: Two eight-axle rail bogies
- Elevation: -3 to +37°
- Traverse: None
- Rate of fire: 1 round every four minutes
- Muzzle velocity: 916 m/s (3,010 ft/s)
- Maximum firing range: 39 km (24 mi)

The Canon de 340 modèle 1912 à glissement was a French railway gun designed during World War I but produced too late to see action during the war. The six guns built were held in reserve between the wars and were mobilized by France during World War II.

== History ==
Although the majority of combatants had heavy field artillery prior to the outbreak of the First World War, none had adequate numbers of heavy guns in service, nor had they foreseen the growing importance of heavy artillery once the Western Front stagnated and trench warfare set in. Since aircraft of the period were not yet capable of carrying large diameter bombs the burden of delivering heavy firepower fell on the artillery. Two sources of heavy artillery suitable for conversion to field use were surplus coastal defense guns and naval guns.

However, a paradox faced artillery designers of the time; while large caliber naval guns were common, large caliber land weapons were not due to their weight, complexity, and lack of mobility. Large caliber field guns often required extensive site preparation because the guns had to be broken down into multiple loads light enough to be towed by a horse team or the few traction engines of the time and then reassembled before use. Building a new gun could address the problem of disassembling, transporting and reassembling a large gun, but it did not necessarily address how to convert existing heavy weapons to make them more mobile. Rail transport proved to be the most practical solution because the problems of heavy weight, lack of mobility and reduced setup time were addressed.

== Design ==
The Canon de 340 modèle 1912 à glissement started life as six 340mm/45 Modèle 1912 naval guns as used on the Bretagne class of super-dreadnoughts. The guns converted were surplus guns that were made available when the Normandie class were canceled. The guns were typical built-up guns of the period with steel construction consisting of a rifled steel liner with several layers of reinforcing hoops and an interrupted screw breech. To load the gun barrel was lowered and a shell was brought forward by an elevated hoist on the rear of the carriage.

The guns consisted of a large rectangular steel base, which was suspended on two eight-axle articulated rail bogies manufactured by Schneider. The number of axles was determined by the weight limit for European railways of 17 tonnes per axle. The carriage was similar to that used by the contemporary Canon de 370 modèle 75/79 Glissement produced by Schneider. Since the carriage did not have a traversing mechanism it was aimed by drawing the guns across a section of curved track. Once in firing position, a section of rail bed was reinforced with wood and iron beams to support the weight of the gun. Five steel beams under the center of the carriage were then lowered to lay across the tracks and the carriage was jacked up to take the weight off the bogies and anchor the gun in place. There were another two beams located between the quadruple bogies on each end of the carriage. When the gun fired the entire carriage recoiled a few feet and was stopped by the friction of the beams on the tracks. The carriage was then lowered onto its axles and was either pushed back into place with a shunting locomotive or a windlass mounted on the front of the carriage pulled the carriage back into position. This cheap, simple and effective system came to characterize Schneider's railway guns during the later war years and is known as the Glissement system.

== World War I ==
The six guns were delivered too late to participate in the First World War and remained in reserve between the wars.

== World War II ==
At the outbreak of the Second World War, the six guns were mobilized and assigned to Heavy Artillery Regiment 373° of the ALVF (Artillerie Lourde sur Voie Ferrée). Two guns were assigned to the 1st battery at Rittershoffen while two more guns were assigned to the 2nd battery near Mouterhouse. Two guns were assigned to the 1st battery of Heavy Artillery Regiment 372° of the ALVF near Volmerange. All six guns survived the Fall of France and the Germans assigned the designation 34 cm Kanone (Eisenbahn) in Gleitlafette 673(f) but what use they made of the guns is unknown.

== Ammunition ==
The guns fired separate loading bagged charges and projectiles. The propellant charge weighed approximately 150 kg (330 lb).

Designation	Weight
HE15A	465 kg (1,025 lb)
HE17 FATO	445 kg (981 lb)
HE32-6 FATO	432 kg (952 lb)
