= French battleship Bretagne =

Dreadnought battleships built in the 1910s for the French Navy

- Bretagne in Toulon during World War I

History

France
- Name: Bretagne
- Namesake: Brittany
- Ordered: 1 May 1912
- Laid down: 22 July 1912
- Launched: 21 April 1913
- Completed: 29 November 1915
- Commissioned: 10 February 1916
- Fate: Sunk, 3 July 1940

General characteristics (as built)
- Class & type: Bretagne-class battleship
- Displacement: 23,936 t (23,558 long tons) (normal); 26,600 t (26,200 long tons) (deep load)
- Length: 166 m (544 ft 7 in) (o/a)
- Beam: 27 m (88 ft 7 in)
- Draught: 9.1 m (29 ft 10 in) (mean)
- Installed power: 28,000 PS (20,594 kW; 27,617 shp); 24 Niclausse boilers
- Propulsion: 4 shafts; 2 steam turbine sets
- Speed: 20.6 knots (38.2 km/h; 23.7 mph)
- Range: 4,700 nmi (8,700 km; 5,400 mi) at 10 knots (19 km/h; 12 mph)
- Crew: 1,193 (1,250 as flagship)
- Armament: 5 × twin 34 cm (13.4 in) guns; 22 × single 138 mm (5.4 in) guns; 2 × single 47 mm (1.9 in) guns; 4 × 450 mm (17.7 in) torpedo tubes
- Armour: Belt: 140–250 mm (5.5–9.8 in); Decks: 40–70 mm (1.6–2.8 in); Conning tower: 266 mm (10.5 in); Turrets: 300 mm (11.8 in); Casemates: 160 mm (6.3 in)

Bretagne was the lead ship of her class of three dreadnought battleships built in the 1910s for the French Navy. Bretagne entered service in February 1916, after the start of World War I. She spent the bulk of her nearly 25-year-long career with the Mediterranean Squadron and sometimes served as its flagship. During World War I she provided cover for the Otranto Barrage that blockaded the Austro-Hungarian Navy in the Adriatic Sea, but saw no action.

The ship was significantly modernised in the interwar period, and when she was on active duty, conducted normal peacetime cruises and training manoeuvres in the Mediterranean and the Atlantic Ocean. After World War II broke out in September 1939, Bretagne escorted troop convoys and was briefly deployed to the Atlantic in search of German blockade runners and commerce raiders. Germany invaded France on 10 May 1940 and the French surrendered only six weeks later, at which time the battleship was stationed in Mers-el-Kébir, French Algeria. Fearful that the Germans would seize the French Navy, the British attacked the ships there on 3 July 1940 after the French refused to surrender or demilitarise the fleet; Bretagne was hit four times and exploded, killing the majority of her crew. Her wreck was salvaged in 1952 and broken up for scrap.

== Background and description ==
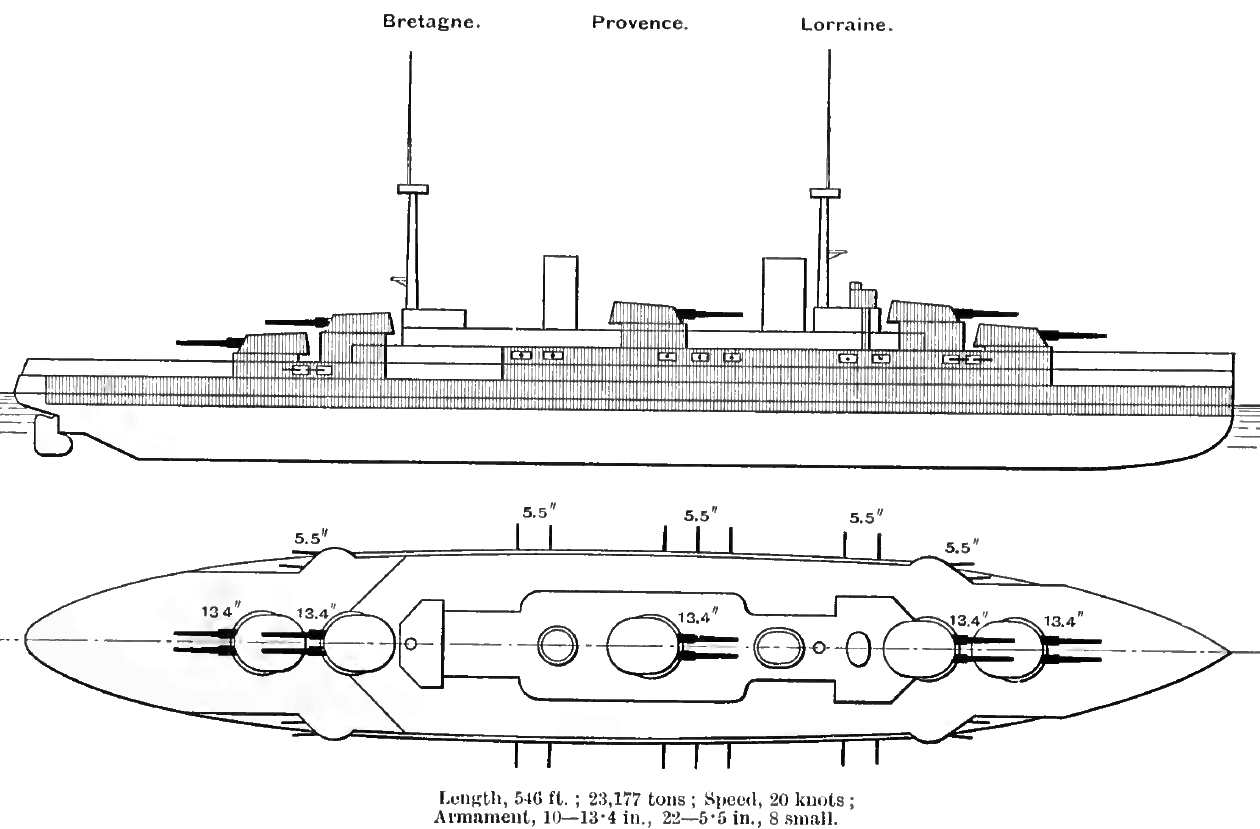
Bretagne-class design as depicted by Brassey's Naval Annual 1915

The Bretagne class of dreadnought battleships was designed as an improved version of the preceding Courbet class with a more powerful armament, but the limited size of French drydocks forced the turrets to be closer to the ends of the ships, adversely affecting their seakeeping abilities.

The ships were 166 metres (544 ft 7 in) long overall, had a beam of 27 m (88 ft 7 in) and a mean draught of 9.1 m (29 ft 10 in). They displaced 23,936 tonnes (23,558 long tons) at normal load and 26,600 tonnes (26,200 long tons) at deep load. Their crew numbered 34 officers and 1,159 men as a private ship and increased to 42 officers and 1,208 crewmen when serving as a flagship.

The ships were powered by two licence-built Parsons steam turbine sets, each driving two propeller shafts, using steam provided by twenty-four Niclausse boilers. The turbines were rated at a total of 28,000 metric horsepower (20,594 kW; 27,617 shp) and were designed for a top speed of 21 knots (39 km/h; 24 mph), but none of the ships exceeded 20.6 knots (38.2 km/h; 23.7 mph) during their sea trials. They carried enough coal and fuel oil to give them a range of 4,700 nautical miles (8,700 km; 5,400 mi) at a speed of 10 knots (19 km/h; 12 mph).

The Bretagne class's main battery consisted of ten Canon de 34 cm (13.4 in) modèle 1912 guns mounted in five twin-gun turrets, numbered one to five from front to rear. Two were in a superfiring pair forward, one amidships, and the last two in a superfiring pair aft. The secondary armament consisted of twenty-two Canon de 138 mm (5.4 in) modèle 1910 guns mounted individually in casemates along the length of the hull. She also carried a pair of Canon de 47 mm (1.9 in) modèle 1902 guns mounted in the forward superstructure in single mounts. Five older 47 mm weapons were installed for sub-calibre training, one on each turret roof, before they entered service. The Bretagnes were also armed with a pair of submerged 450 mm (17.7 in) torpedo tubes on each broadside and could stow 20–28 mines below decks. Their waterline belt ranged in thickness from 140 to 250 mm (5.5 to 9.8 in) and was thickest amidships. Armour plate that was 300 mm (11.8 in) thick protected the gun turrets and 160 mm (6.3 in) plates protected the casemates. The curved armoured deck was 40 mm (1.6 in) thick on the flat and 70 mm (2.8 in) on the outer slopes. The armour of the conning tower was 266 mm (10.5 in) thick.

== Construction and career ==
=== 1912–1923 ===
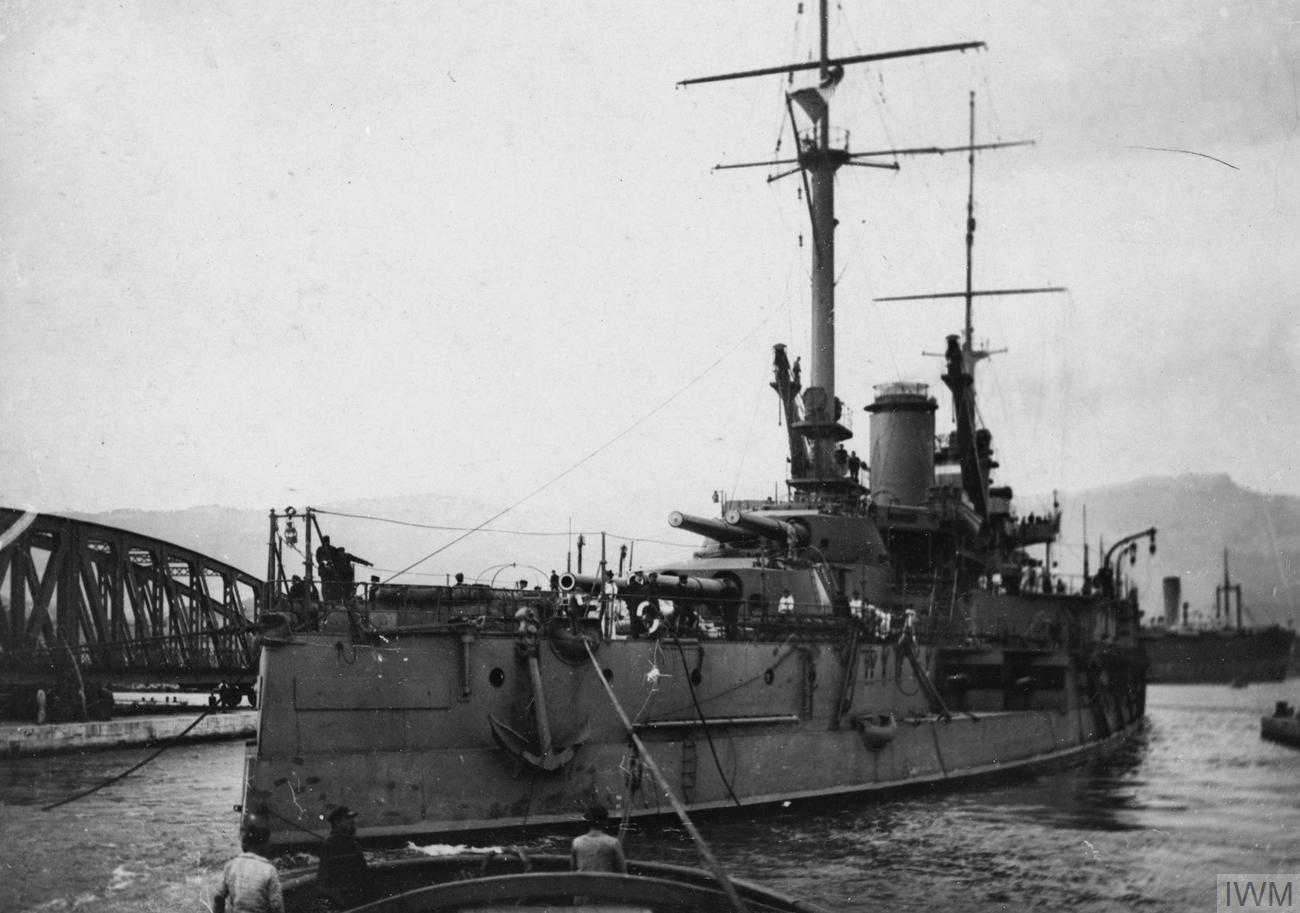
Bretagne in Toulon harbour, 23 October 1916

The ship was ordered on 1 May 1912 and named in honour of the province of Brittany. Bretagne was laid down on 22 July 1912 at the Brest Arsenal, launched on 21 April 1913, completed on 29 November 1915, and commissioned into the fleet on 10 February 1916. After entering service, she was assigned to the 1st Division (1ère Division) of the 1st Battle Squadron (1ère Escadre de ligne) and became the flagship of Vice-Admiral (Vice-amiral) Dominique-Marie Gauchet, commander of the squadron, on 10 May. They spent the majority of their time at Corfu to prevent the Austro-Hungarian fleet from attempting to break out of the Adriatic. They also supported the Otranto Barrage, a barrier erected to block German and Austro-Hungarian U-boats operating in the Mediterranean. The fleet's presence was also intended to intimidate Greece, which had become increasingly hostile to the Triple Entente. Later in the war, men were drawn from her crew for anti-submarine warfare vessels. As the Austro-Hungarians largely remained in port for the duration of the war, Bretagne saw no action during the conflict. In fact, she did not leave port at all for the entirety of 1917, due to a severe shortage of coal at Corfu. The 47 mm modèle 1902 guns were replaced by a pair of Canon de 75 mm (3 in) modèle 1897 guns on anti-aircraft (AA) mounts in 1918. Bretagne returned to Toulon after the war's end in November.

The ship received a lengthy refit there from 12 June 1919 to 18 October 1920. This included modifications to her gun turrets which increased the elevation of her main armament from 12° to 18° and thus their maximum range. The four forward 138 mm guns were removed and their casemates plated over, because they could only be worked in good weather—in rough seas, water would frequently rush over the guns. The 75 mm AA guns were replaced by four 75 mm modèle 1918 AA guns mounted amidships. The ship's foremast was replaced by a tripod mast and her mainmast was shortened to allow the ship to fly a captive kite balloon. A Vickers fire-control director that was equipped with a 3.66-metre (12 ft) rangefinder was installed atop the tripod mast; two other 2-metre (6 ft 7 in) rangefinders were added, one on each side of the superstructure for the 138 mm guns. Flying-off platforms were fitted to the roofs of Turrets 2 and 4, but these were unsuccessful.

Bretagne became flagship of the Mediterranean Squadron again on 6 June 1921 when Vice-Admiral Henri Salaun hoisted his flag aboard her. The ship accompanied her sister ship Provence to Le Havre for a naval review that month, and they were back in Toulon in September. During this period, Lieutenant de vaisseau Paul Teste used Bretagne in a series of dive-bombing experiments. Bretagne and the battleship France hosted the British battleship Queen Elizabeth and the light cruiser Coventry during a port visit to Villefranche from 18 February to 1 March 1922. The two French battleships had a gunnery exercise on 28 June using the former Austro-Hungarian battleship Prinz Eugen as a target and sank her. On 18 July, Bretagne, France and the battleship Paris began a cruise visiting French ports in the Bay of Biscay and English Channel. On the evening of 25/26 August, France struck an uncharted rock while entering Quiberon and sank several hours later. Bretagne and Paris were able to rescue all but three of her crew. During a training exercise, Bretagne briefly ran aground in the Bizerte canal in Tunisia on 22 June 1923, but was not damaged. Provence relieved Bretagne as the fleet flagship on 1 September.

=== 1924–1939 ===
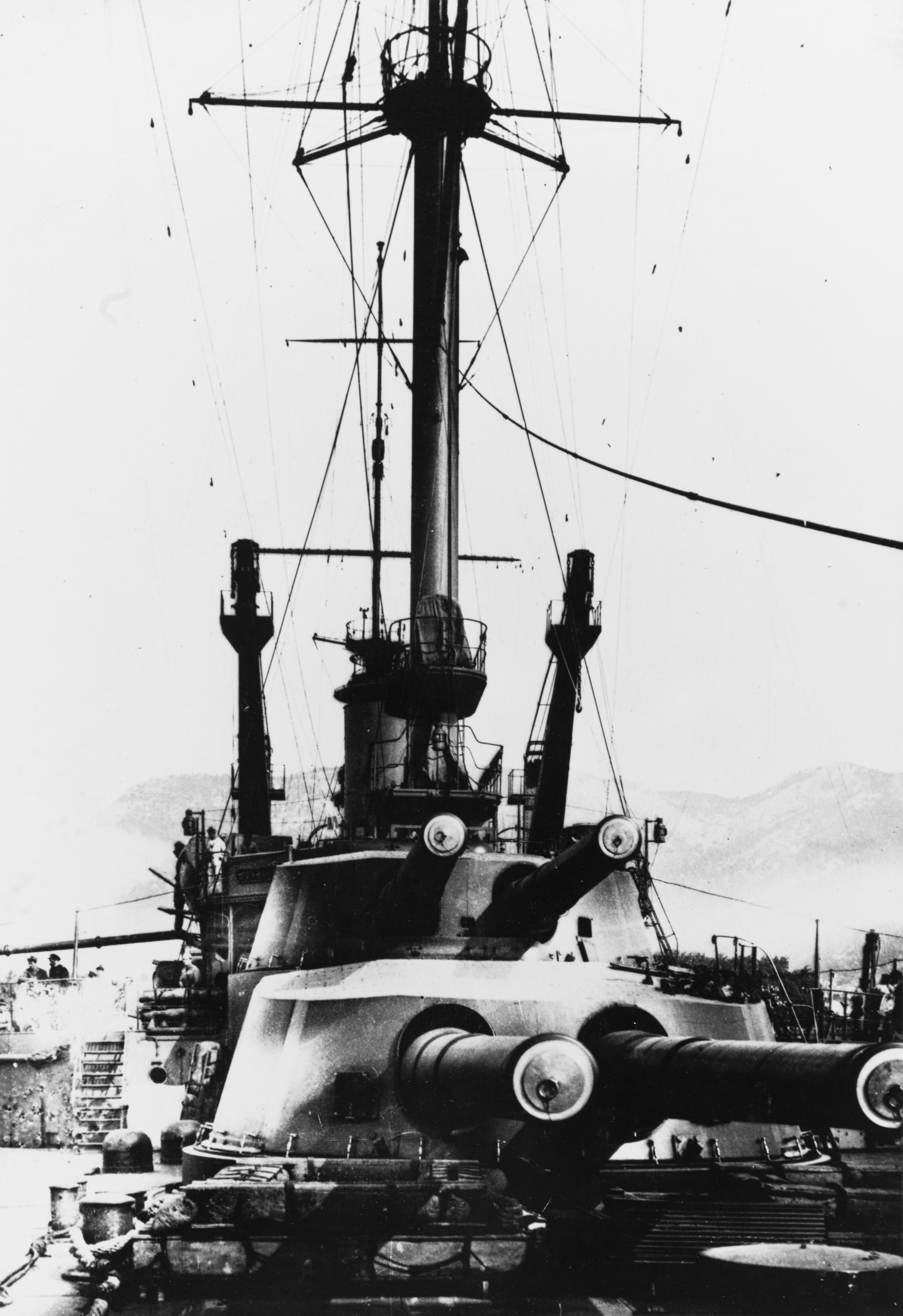
Bretagne's aft turrets, 1919

She received a major refit at Toulon from 1 May 1924 to 28 September 1925, during which the elevation of her main armament was increased to 23°, giving her guns a maximum range of 23,700 metres (25,900 yd), and two 1.5-metre (4 ft 11 in) high-angle rangefinders were added for the AA guns. Part of her forward hull armour was removed to lighten the bow and increase her forward freeboard, one group of boilers was converted to oil-firing and the flying-off platforms were removed. The ship resumed her position as flagship of the Mediterranean Squadron when her refit was completed. Bretagne transported the Navy Minister, Georges Leygues, to Malta for an official visit over the period 27 April – 1 May 1926. Provence reassumed the role of fleet flagship on 1 October 1927 when Bretagne prepared to begin a refit to overhaul her boilers that began on 15 November and lasted until 12 May 1928. The navy took the opportunity to upgrade her fire-control systems, replacing her Vickers model with a French Saint Chamond-Granat system in a director-control tower (DCT), and replaced all of her original rangefinders with the exception of the 2-metre (6 ft 7 in) rangefinders in each turret. A pair of 4.57-metre (15 ft) rangefinders were added on the conning tower roof, another one in the DCT at the top of the foremast and another at the base of the mainmast. A 3-metre (9 ft 10 in) rangefinder was added to the DCT to measure the distance between the target and shell splashes, and a traversable 8.2-metre (26 ft 11 in) rangefinder was fitted to the roof of No. 2 turret. Directors with 2-metre rangefinders were also added to control the secondary guns.

On 3 July 1928, Bretagne, Provence and their sister Lorraine participated in a fleet review by the President of France, Gaston Doumergue, at Le Havre and they spent the following year in the Mediterranean. Bretagne, Provence and Paris participated in another fleet review by Doumergue on 10 May 1930 that commemorated the centennial of the conquest of Algeria. On 1 October 1930, Bretagne was decommissioned in anticipation of a modernisation that began on 1 July 1932. Her original coal-fired boilers were replaced by new and smaller oil-burning ones, which allowed the No. 2 boiler room to be converted into an oil tank. This increased her fuel capacity to 2,500 tonnes (2,500 long tons). Geared Parsons cruise turbines were fitted to the inboard propeller shafts and the outer high-pressure turbines were replaced. The four aft 138 mm guns were removed and their casemates plated over. The four 75 mm mle 1918 AA guns were replaced by eight Canon de 75 mm modèle 1922 AA guns and the torpedo tubes were removed. A new DCT was installed as were a pair of anti-aircraft directors fitted with 2-metre rangefinders.

After the modernisation was completed on 12 November 1934, Bretagne remained in Toulon for working up until 11 May 1935, when she left to join her sisters in the 2nd Division (2e Division) of the 2nd Battle Squadron (2e Escadre de ligne) for manoevres off the Azores. The ships also made port visits in the islands and French Morocco before sailing to Brest where they arrived on 16 June. As tensions with Nazi Germany rose, the French naval command decided that the squadron based in Brest should be strengthened to deter Germany, so Bretagne and her sisters were stationed there for most of the rest of the decade. Later in June 1934, Bretagne participated in exercises with the combined fleet. She was briefly refitted from 29 October to 3 December. Together with Provence, Bretagne had gunnery practice off Groix, Brittany, on 7–11 July. On 15 August, the 2nd Squadron was renamed the Atlantic Squadron (Escadre de l'Atlantique). Beginning in 1936, all three sisters had their 4.57-metre rangefinders replaced by 5-metre (16 ft 5 in) ones. The 2nd Battle Division visited ports in the Azores, Madeira, Portuguese Cape Verde, and French Morocco, returning to Brest on 26 February 1937. Later that year Navy Minister Alphonse Gasnier-Duparc reviewed the combined Atlantic and Mediterranean Squadrons on 27 May after that year's fleet manoevres. Beginning in 1938, the sisters had the rangefinder in the DCT replaced by a 8-metre (26 ft 3 in) model. Bretagne finished a refit on 1 October 1938 and was then working up until May 1939. The 2nd Battle Division was transferred to the Mediterranean Squadron on 10 June 1939.

=== World War II ===
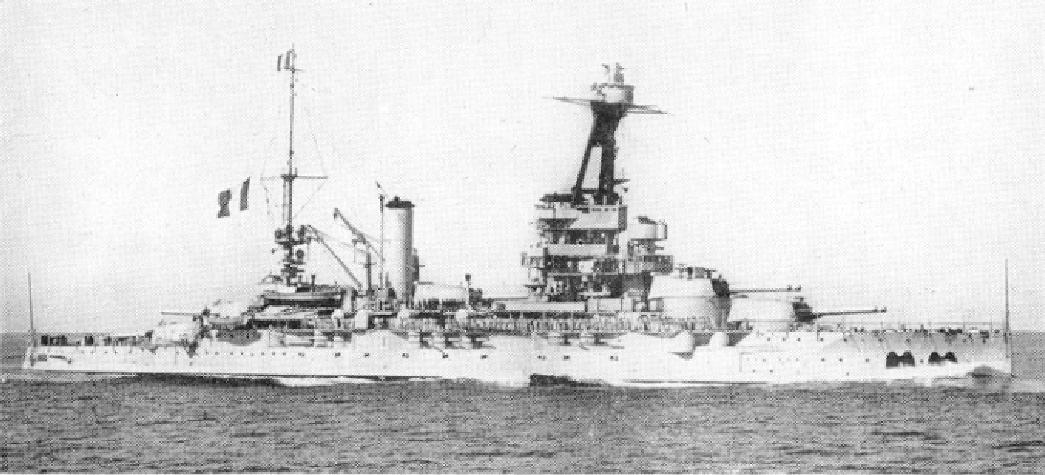
Provence after her 1934 modernisation

At the start of World War II in September 1939, the division was based in Toulon. At the time, Italy was neutral, so there was no immediate threat in the Mediterranean. Nonetheless, the sisters escorted troop convoys between France and French North Africa from 1 September to 5 October. On 4 December, Bretagne and Provence, along with the cruisers Colbert, Dupleix, and Primauguet and several destroyers and submarines operated out of Dakar, French West Africa in search of German commerce raiders and blockade runners without success. Around the middle of the month, the task force began to return to the Mediterranean. After returning to Toulon, Bretagne underwent an extensive overhaul, which lasted until 3 March 1940, during which her 8-metre rangefinder was replaced by a 12-metre (39 ft 4 in) rangefinder.

On 11 March, she left France carrying 1,820 boxes of gold bars from the French treasury together with the heavy cruiser Algérie, which carried another 1,179 boxes. These two ships were designated Force X. They arrived in Halifax, Nova Scotia, on 22 March. On the return voyage, they escorted two American merchant ships carrying 82 aircraft bought by France and arrived at Toulon on 10 April. Five days later, Bretagne sailed to Oran, French Algeria, together with Lorraine, arriving on the 18th where they joined Provence. On 27 April, the 2nd Battle Division was transferred to Algiers and then to Alexandria, Egypt. Bretagne and her sisters passed through the Strait of Sicily on 30 April, covered by the French 3rd Cruiser Division on their way to Alexandria. While still en route, they met the British battleships HMS Royal Sovereign and Malaya, after which the cruisers departed, leaving the battleships to continue on to their destination, where they were assigned to a new Force X.

As war with Italy became increasingly likely following Germany's invasion of France on 10 May, the Anglo-French naval command decided to concentrate naval forces in the western Mediterranean. Bretagne and Provence were accordingly recalled from Force X; they left Alexandria on 20 May, their place in Force X being taken by a pair of cruisers. Bretagne and Provence steamed together with two destroyers and reached Bizerte on 23 May. Admiral François Darlan, Commander-in-Chief of the French Navy, decided that all capital ships should be concentrated in Mers El Kébir, so he instructed them to steam there. Bretagne and Provence arrived there on 27 May, where they rendezvoused with the Force de Raid, France's most modern ships, in an unsuccessful effort to deter Italy from joining the war.

==== Loss ====
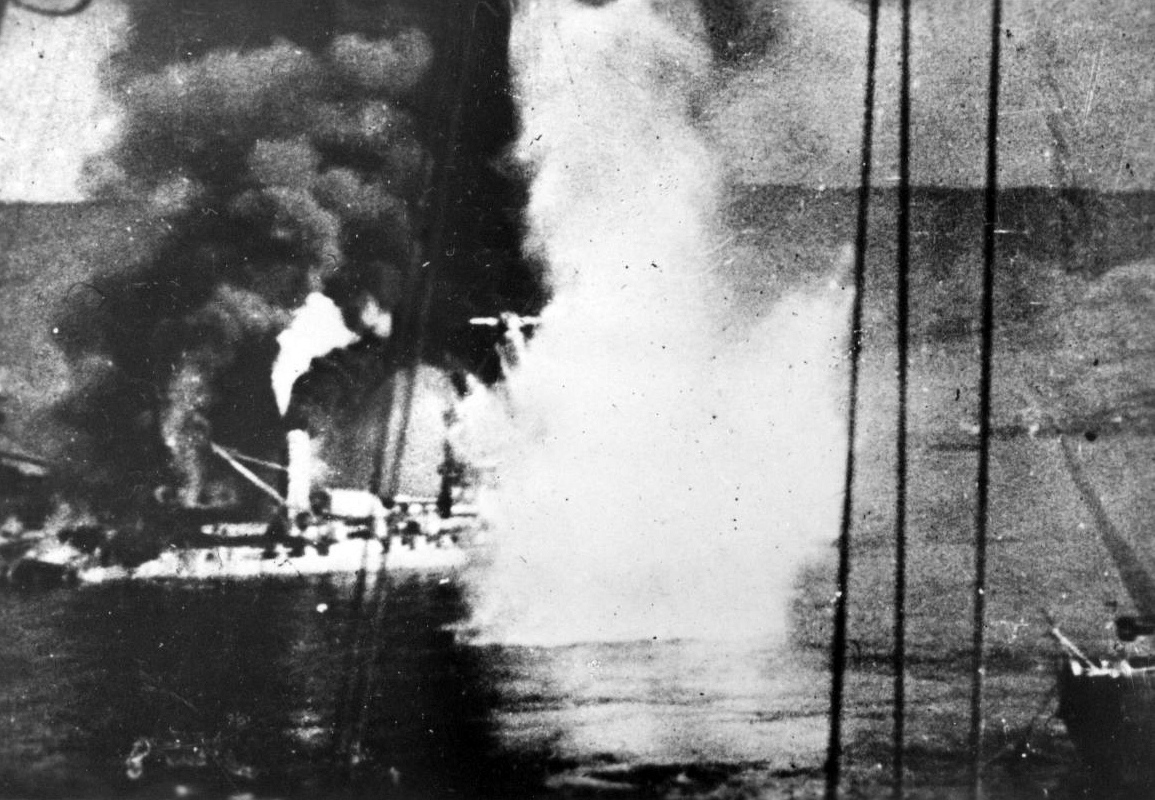
Bretagne, partially obscured by the shell splash, is on fire and sinking by the stern, 3 July 1940

Following the French surrender on 22 June 1940, the French fleet was to be disarmed under German and Italian supervision. The British high command was concerned that the French ships would be seized by the Axis powers and placed in service. Prime Minister Winston Churchill therefore ordered Vice-Admiral James Somerville, the commander of Force H, to neutralise the French fleet at Mers-el-Kébir. He was instructed to order the French vessels to either join the British with the Free French, surrender for internment, to scuttle themselves, or be sunk. On 3 July, Somerville arrived and delivered the ultimatum; the French rejected it, and so the British ships opened fire.

Bretagne, having remained in Mers El Kébir since being stationed there one month earlier, was hit by four 15-inch (381 mm) projectiles from Hood, Resolution, and Valiant (no ship is individually credited). The first two shells struck simultaneously at 16:59 (Note: The times given here are French local time, British Double Summer Time was one hour later.) in the third salvo. The first hit the ship near turret No. 4, causing a large explosion that sent flames as high as the masthead and blew a hole in the side of the hull. The resulting flooding limited the explosion's effect on the ship. The second shell struck above the waterline, and detonated in the centre engine room, killing all but one of the sailors inside. It knocked out all power and damaged the internal communication system of the ship. Seven minutes later, two other large shells struck Bretagne. One detonated near Turret No. 3 and ignited some ready-use projectiles which were stored in lockers next to the anti-aircraft mounts. At 17:09 a large explosion occurred in the ship and she rolled over and capsized with the loss of 36 officers, 151 petty officers and 825 seamen. The Société de matérial naval du Midi attempted to salvage the wreck in late 1942, but it was called off after a diver was seriously injured by an explosion when attempting to cut through the hull with an oxy-acetylene torch. The Serra Frères company salvaged Bretagne's wreck, breaking up the vessel for scrap beginning in 1952 and completing the job on 21 December 1954.
