= French battleship Provence =

French Bretagne-class battleship

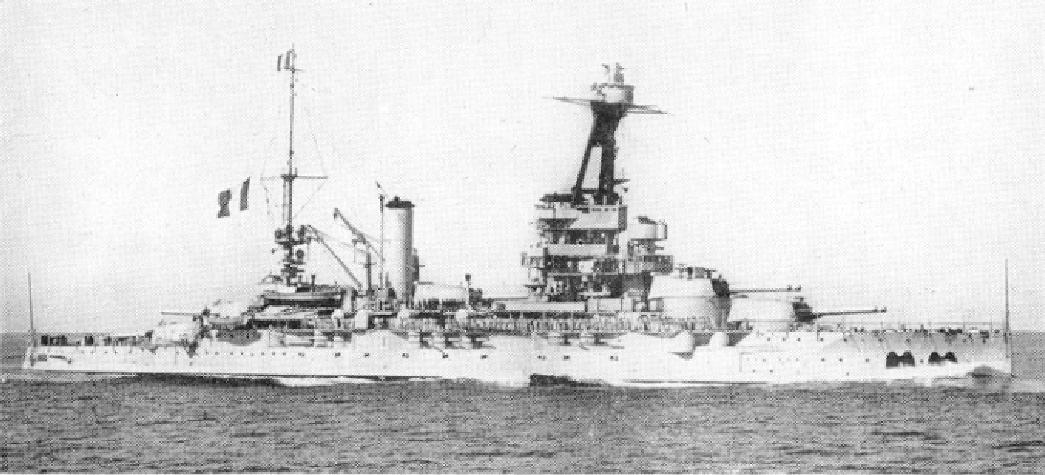
- Provence underway

History

France
- Name: Provence
- Namesake: Provence
- Builder: Arsenal de Lorient
- Laid down: 21 April 1912
- Launched: 20 April 1913
- Completed: 20 January 1916
- Commissioned: 1 March 1916
- Fate: Scuttled, 27 November 1942

General characteristics (as built)
- Class & type: Bretagne-class battleship
- Displacement: 23,936 t (23,558 long tons) (normal); 26,000 t (26,000 long tons) (deep load)
- Length: 166 m (544 ft 7 in) (o/a)
- Beam: 27 m (88 ft 7 in)
- Draft: 9.1 m (29 ft 10 in) (mean)
- Installed power: 28,000 PS (21,000 kW); 18 × Guyot-Du Temple boilers
- Propulsion: 4 shafts; 2 steam turbine sets
- Speed: 20 knots (37 km/h; 23 mph)
- Range: 4,700 nmi (8,700 km; 5,400 mi) at 10 knots (19 km/h; 12 mph)
- Crew: 1,193; (1,250 as flagship)
- Armament: 5 × twin 340 mm (13.4 in) guns; 22 × single 138 mm (5.4 in) guns; 2 × single 47 mm (1.9 in) guns; 4 × 450 mm (17.7 in) torpedo tubes
- Armor: Belt: 140–250 mm (5.5–9.8 in); Decks: 40–70 mm (1.6–2.8 in); Conning tower: 266 mm (10.5 in); Turrets: 300 mm (11.8 in); Casemates: 160 mm (6.3 in)

Provence was one of three Bretagne-class battleships built for the French Navy in the 1910s, named in honor of the French region of Provence; she had two sister ships, Bretagne and Lorraine. Provence entered service in March 1916, after the outbreak of World War I. She was armed with a main battery of ten 340 mm (13.4 in) guns and had a top speed of 20 knots (37 km/h; 23 mph).

Provence spent the bulk of her career in the French Mediterranean Squadron, where she served as the fleet flagship. During World War I, she was stationed at Corfu to prevent the Austro-Hungarian fleet from leaving the Adriatic Sea, but she saw no action. She was modernized significantly in the 1920s and 1930s, and conducted normal peacetime cruises and training maneuvers in the Mediterranean and Atlantic Ocean. She participated in non-intervention patrols during the Spanish Civil War.

In the early days of World War II, Provence conducted patrols and sweeps into the Atlantic to search for German surface raiders. She was stationed in Mers-el-Kébir when France surrendered on 22 June 1940. Fearful that the Germans would seize the French Navy, the British Royal Navy attacked the ships at Mers-el-Kébir. Provence was damaged and sank in the harbor, though she was refloated and moved to Toulon, where she became the flagship of the training fleet there. In late November 1942, the Germans occupied Toulon and, to prevent them from seizing the fleet, the French scuttled their ships, including Provence. She was raised in July 1943, and some of her guns were used for coastal defense in the area; the Germans scuttled her a second time in Toulon as a blockship in 1944. Provence was ultimately raised in April 1949 and sold to ship breakers.

== Background and description ==
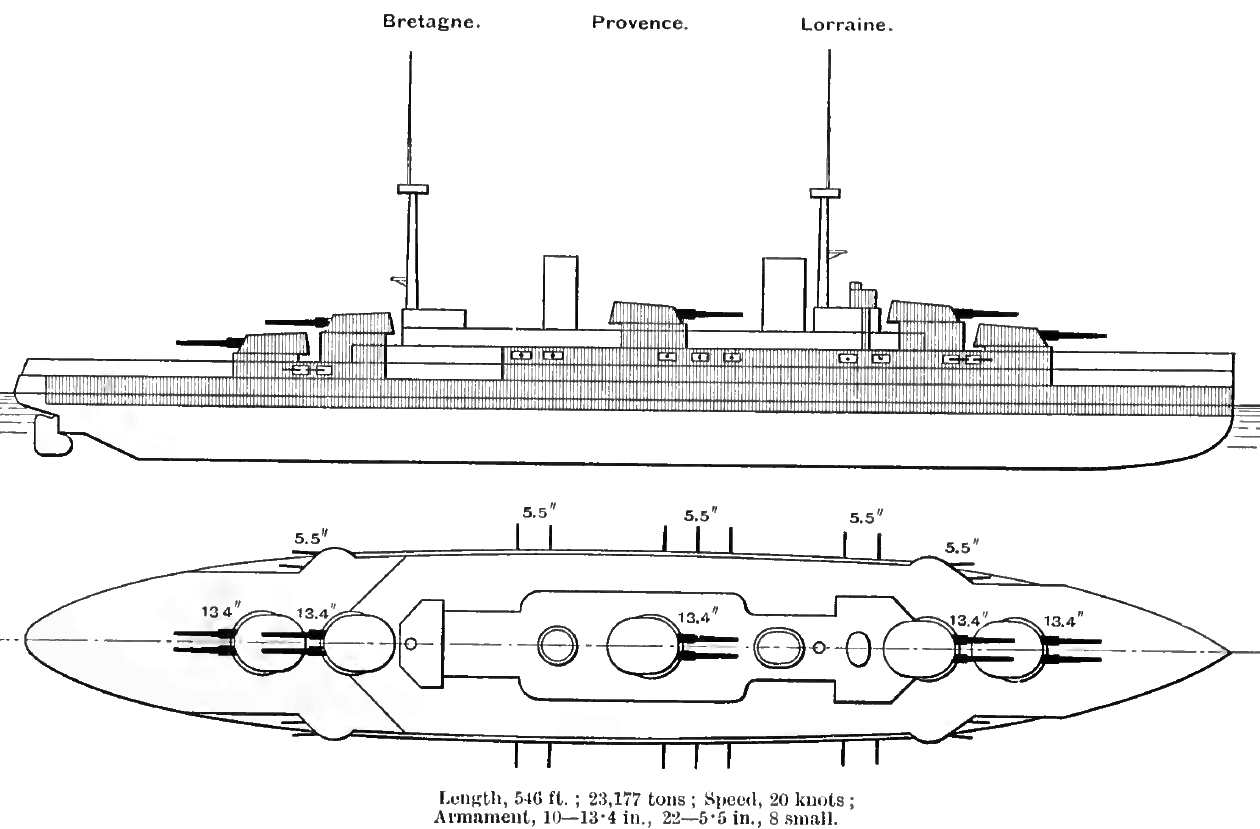
Bretagne-class design as depicted by Brassey's Naval Annual 1915

The Bretagne class was designed as an improved version of the preceding Courbet class with a more powerful armament, but the limited size of French drydocks forced the turrets to be closer to the ends of the ships, adversely affecting their seakeeping abilities.

The ships were 166 meters (544 ft 7 in) long overall, had a beam of 27 m (88 ft 7 in) and a mean draft of 9.1 m (29 ft 10 in). They displaced 23,936 metric tons (23,558 long tons) at normal load and 26,600 metric tons (26,200 long tons) at deep load. Their crew numbered 34 officers and 1,159 men as a private ship and increased to 42 officers and 1,208 crewmen when serving as a flagship.

The ships were powered by two license-built Parsons steam turbine sets, each driving two propeller shafts. Each of the Bretagne-class ships had a different type of boiler providing steam to the turbines; Provence herself had 18 Guyot-Du Temple boilers. The turbines were rated at a total of 28,000 metric horsepower (20,594 kW; 27,617 shp) and were designed for a top speed of 21 knots (39 km/h; 24 mph), but none of the ships exceeded 20.6 knots (38.2 km/h; 23.7 mph) during their sea trials. They carried enough coal and fuel oil to give them a range of 4,700 nautical miles (8,700 km; 5,400 mi) at a speed of 10 knots (19 km/h; 12 mph).

The Bretagne class's main battery consisted of ten Canon de 34 cm (13.4 in) modèle 1912 guns mounted in five twin-gun turrets, numbered one to five from front to rear. Two were in a superfiring pair forward, one amidships, and the last two in a superfiring pair aft. The secondary armament consisted of twenty-two Canon de 138 mm (5.4 in) modèle 1910 guns in casemates along the length of the hull. She also carried a pair of Canon de 47 mm (1.9 in) modèle 1902 guns mounted in the forward superstructure. Five older 47 mm weapons were placed on each turret roof for sub-caliber training before they entered service. The Bretagnes were also armed with four submerged 450 mm (17.7 in) torpedo tubes and could stow 20–28 mines below decks.

Their waterline belt ranged in thickness from 140 to 250 mm (5.5 to 9.8 in) and was thickest amidships. The gun turrets were protected by 300 mm (11.8 in) of armor and 160 mm (6.3 in) plates protected the casemates. The curved armored deck was 40 mm (1.6 in) thick on the flat and 70 mm (2.8 in) on the outer slopes. The conning tower had 266 mm (10.5 in) thick face and sides.

== Service ==
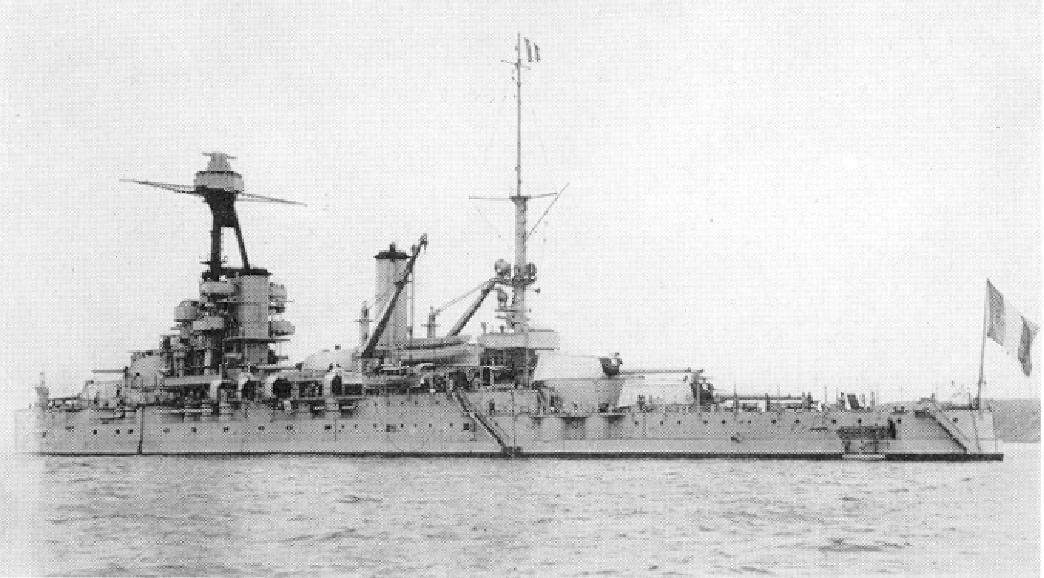
US Navy recognition photo of Provence

After entering service in 1916, Provence and her sisters were assigned to the 1st Division of the 1st Battle Squadron, with Provence as the fleet flagship. The three ships remained in the unit for the remainder of the war. They spent the majority of their time at Corfu to prevent the Austro-Hungarian fleet from attempting to break out of the Adriatic. The fleet's presence was also intended to intimidate Greece, which had become increasingly hostile to the Triple Entente. Later in the war, men were drawn from their crews for anti-submarine warfare vessels. As the Austro-Hungarians largely remained in port for the duration of the war, Provence saw no action during the conflict. Indeed, she did not leave port at all for the entirety of 1917. In April 1919, she returned to Toulon. The French Navy intended to send the ship to the Black Sea to join operations against the Bolsheviks, but a major mutiny prevented the operation. She and Lorraine went to Constantinople in October 1919, where they formed the core of the Eastern Mediterranean Squadron.

In June 1921, Provence and Bretagne went to Le Havre for a naval review, and were back in Toulon in September. In 1922, Provence and Lorraine were placed in reserve, leaving Bretagne the only member of her class in service; while out of service, Provence underwent a significant refit. The work lasted from 1 February 1922 to 4 July 1923, and was carried out in Toulon. The ship had her armament improved; her main guns were given greater elevation to increase their range, and four 75 mm M1897 guns were installed on the forward superstructure. A heavy tripod mast with a fire control station and a rangefinder for the ship's anti-aircraft guns were also added.

Another refit followed on 12 December 1925 – 11 July 1927. The elevation of the main battery guns was again increased, the bow section of the belt armor was removed, and half of her boilers were converted to oil-firing models. A third and final modernization began on 20 September 1931 and lasted until 20 August 1934. The rest of the coal-fired boilers were replaced with six Indret oil-fired boilers, new turbines and main battery guns were installed, along with eight new 75 mm anti-aircraft guns. After emerging from the refit, Provence and Bretagne were assigned to the 2nd Squadron in the Atlantic. There, they joined fleet exercises off the Azores, Madeira, and Morocco. The two ships took part in a cruise to Africa in 1936. In August, they were involved in non-intervention patrols after the outbreak of the Spanish Civil War; these patrols lasted until April 1937.

=== World War II ===
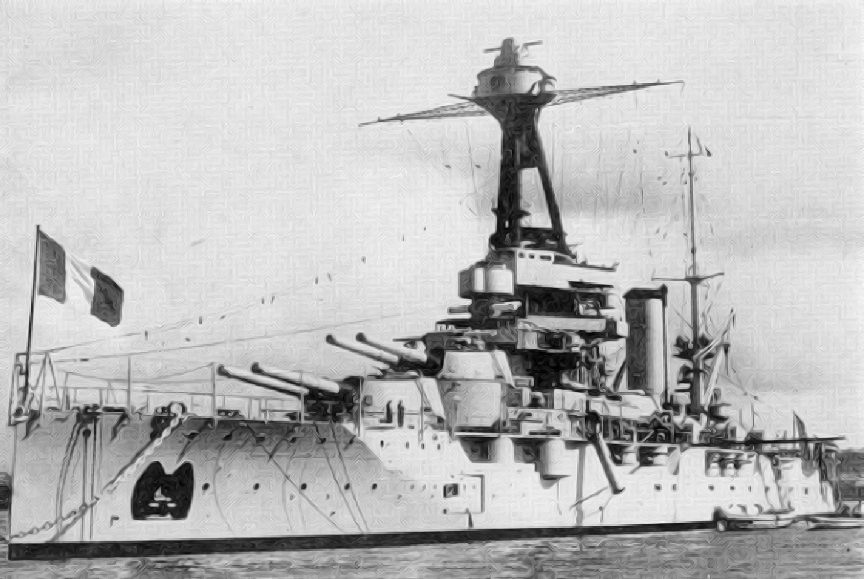
Provence in harbor

At the outbreak of World War II in September 1939, Provence was in Toulon along with Bretagne in the 2nd Squadron, with Provence serving as the flagship of Vice Admiral Ollive. On 21 October, she went into drydock for periodic maintenance, which lasted until 2 December. Two days later, Provence and Bretagne, along with numerous cruisers and destroyers, sortied from Dakar to cover French merchant shipping off West Africa and the Azores. Around the middle of the month, the French warships returned to port.

Provence was then sent to Casablanca, where she joined Force Y. The unit conducted several fruitless sweeps into the Atlantic. While in Gibraltar, she was damaged and forced to return to Toulon for repairs. While en route, she intercepted the Italian passenger ship Oceania; Provence dispatched her to Marseille so she could be inspected for contraband. Provence sailed for Oran on 24 January 1940, and then returned to Force Y in Dakar. Force Y was transferred to Oran on 11 April, arriving five days later. On 27 April, Provence, her two sisters, and several cruisers were moved to Alexandria. On 18 May, Provence and Bretagne returned to Mers El Kébir.

Following the French surrender on 22 June, the French fleet was to be disarmed under German and Italian supervision, under the terms of the Armistice. The British high command, however, was concerned that the French ships would be seized by the Axis powers and placed in service. The Axis navies would then outnumber the British Royal Navy. Prime Minister Winston Churchill therefore ordered Vice Admiral James Somerville, the commander of Force H, to neutralize the French fleet at Mers-el-Kébir. He was instructed to order the French vessels to comply with one of various possible courses of action: these were as follows, either to join the British with the Free French, or to move the ships to French possessions like Martinique where they would be outside the reach of the Axis powers, or to move them to the USA where they would be interned, or to scuttle themselves, or be sunk. On 3 July, Somerville arrived and delivered the ultimatum. After 10 hours of discussions and the French rejection of any part of the ultimatum, the British ships opened fire.

Provence returned fire about 90 seconds after the British attacked, though she had no success against her assailants. Bretagne was hit by several 15-inch (380 mm) shells and exploded, killing most of her crew. Provence was also hit several times and badly damaged; the shells set her on fire and caused her to settle to the bottom of the harbor, but she did not explode like her sister ship. The ship was subsequently refloated and temporarily repaired, and on 5 November, she was transferred to Toulon, arriving on the 8th. Provence was escorted by the destroyers Épée, Fleuret, Le Hardi, Lansquenet, and Mameluk. Beginning on 1 January 1942, Provence became the flagship of the Flag Officer, Training Division. On 27 November, the German Army occupied Toulon, and to prevent them from seizing the fleet there, including Provence, the French scuttled their ships. At the time, Provence was moored next to the old pre-dreadnought Condorcet and the seaplane carrier Commandant Teste. The Italians moved into Toulon and raised Provence on 11 July 1943. Two of her 340 mm guns were removed from the ship and emplaced in a coastal battery at Saint-Mandrier-sur-Mer outside Toulon. The Axis then scuttled the ship a second time, as a blockship in the harbor. Provence was ultimately raised in April 1949 and was broken up for scrap.
