= 340mm/45 Modèle 1912 gun =

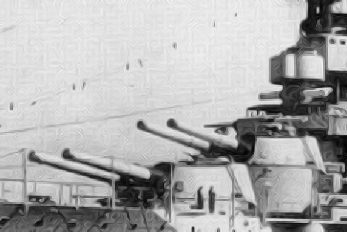
- The main guns of the battleship Provence
- Type: Naval gun
- Place of origin: France

Service history
- In service: 1915–1953
- Used by: France; Nazi Germany
- Wars: World War I World War II

Production history
- Designed: 1912
- Produced: 1912–1921
- Variants: Model 1912; Model 1912M; Type C

Specifications
- Mass: 66 t (65 long tons; 73 short tons)
- Barrel length: 15.4 m (51 ft) L/45
- Shell: Separate-loading, bagged charge and projectiles
- Shell weight: 382–575 kg (842–1,268 lb)
- Calibre: 340 mm (13.4 in)
- Breech: Welin breech block
- Elevation: Naval: -5° to +15° Coastal: 0 to +50°
- Traverse: Fore and aft: -150° to +150° Q turret: +30 to +150 L/R
- Rate of fire: 2 rpm
- Muzzle velocity: 800 m/s (2,600 ft/s)
- Maximum firing range: Naval: 25–29 km (16–18 mi) at +23° Coastal: 38.7 km (24 mi) at +45°

The 340mm/45 Modèle 1912 gun (13.4 in) was a heavy naval gun of the French Navy. While the calibres of the naval guns of the French Navy were usually very close to those of their British counterparts, (Note: The 380mm is close to the British 15 inch, the 340mm to the 13.5 inch and the 305mm to the 12 inch.) the calibre of 340 mm is specific to the French Navy.

The built-up gun was designed to be carried by the Normandie and Lyon classes in quadruple gun turrets, but no ship of these types was completed as a battleship. They were carried by the Bretagne-class battleships in twin turrets. Some of these guns were used as railway guns and coastal artillery in World War I, also serving in World War II.

== Railway gun ==
Due to the cancellation or conversion of most of the ships these guns were made for, the relatively large number of spare guns available facilitated their use as railway guns in both World Wars. Two batteries of 340 mm guns, with an authorized strength of one gun per battery, were operated by the 53rd Coast Artillery, U. S. Army, in World War I. As with most French railway guns, after the Fall of France in World War II some of these weapons were used by the German army.

Two different railway guns were produced from these surplus guns:

- Canon de 340 modèle 1912 à berceau - Six were converted by the St. Chamond company and saw action during both wars.
- Canon de 340 modèle 1912 à glissement - Six were converted by the Schneider company and these came too late for the First World War but participated in the Second World War.

== Coast Defense Gun ==
During Operation Dragoon, the Free French battleship Lorraine was one of the units engaged with 'Big Willie', ex-French turret battery controlling the approaches to Toulon. 'Big Willie' was armed with the guns taken from the French battleship Provence, as a replacement for the original guns, sabotaged by its French crews, making this an unusual instance of both sides of an engagement using the 340mm/45 Modèle 1912 gun.

== See also ==
=== Weapons of comparable role, performance and era ===
- BL 13.5 inch Mk V naval gun British equivalent
- 14"/45 caliber gun US Navy equivalent

== Gallery ==
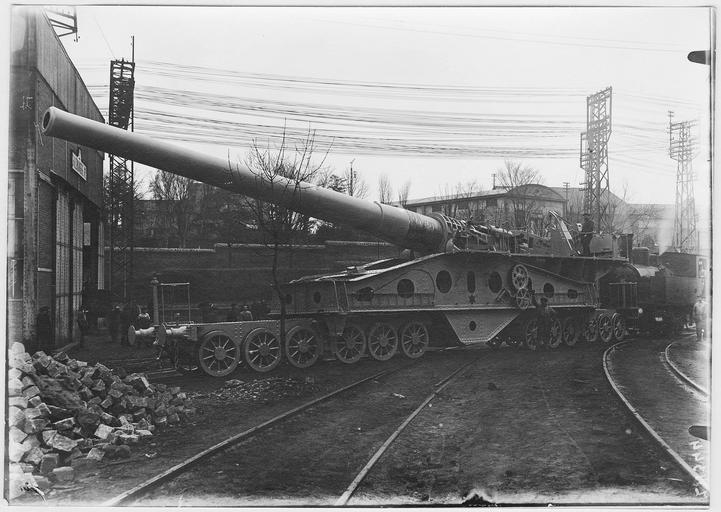
Canon de 340 modèle 1912 à berceau.

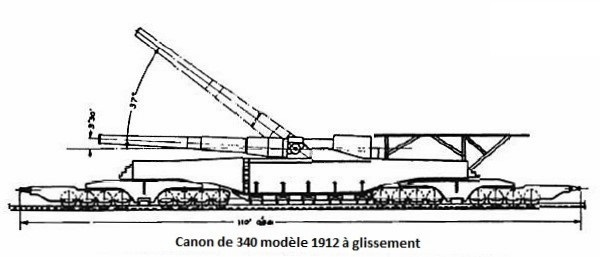
Canon de 340 modèle 1912 à glissement.

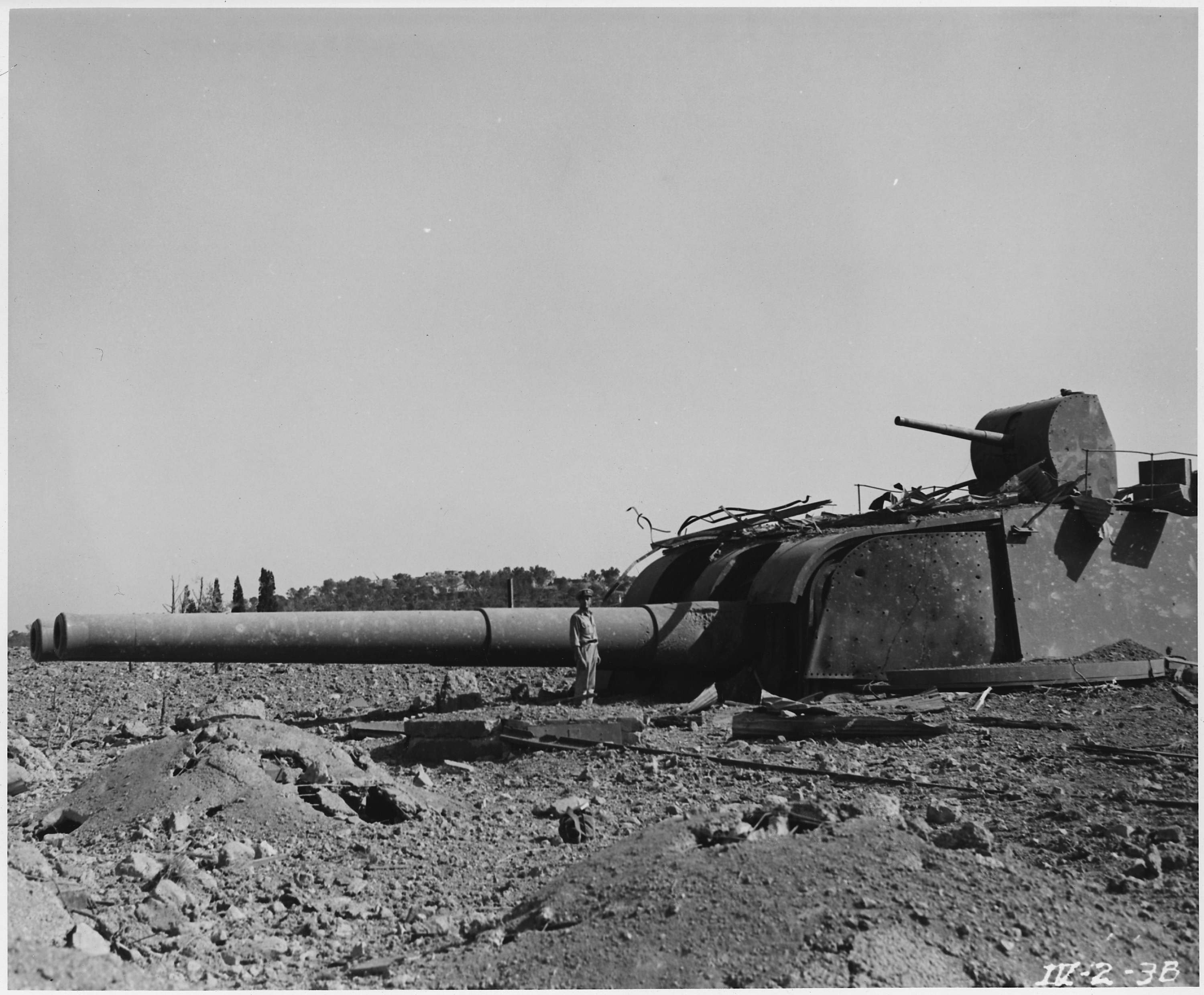
One of prewar French armoured turrets, equipped with Provence's guns.

== Bibliography ==
- Jordan, John (2019). "The 340mm Coast Defence Battery at Cape Cépet". In Jordan, John (ed.). Warship 2019. Oxford, UK: Osprey Publishing. pp. 110–117. ISBN 978-1-4728-3595-6.
