= Normandie-class battleship =

Abortive super-dreadnought class of the French Navy

- Artist's impression of a Normandie-class battleship

Class overview
- Operators: French Navy
- Preceded by: Bretagne class
- Succeeded by: Lyon class (planned); Dunkerque class (actual)
- Planned: 5
- Completed: 1 (Béarn, as an aircraft carrier)
- Scrapped: 5

General characteristics
- Type: Dreadnought battleship
- Displacement: 25,250 t (24,850 long tons) (normal); 28,270 t (27,820 long tons) (full load)
- Length: 176.4 m (578 ft 9 in) (o/a)
- Beam: 27 m (88 ft 7 in)
- Draft: 8.84 m (29 ft)
- Installed power: 32,000 PS (23,536 kW; 31,562 shp); 21 or 28 × water-tube boilers
- Propulsion: 4 shafts; 1 × steam turbine set; 2 × triple-expansion steam engines; Or; 2 × steam turbine sets (Béarn)
- Speed: 21 knots (39 km/h; 24 mph)
- Range: 6,600 nmi (12,200 km; 7,600 mi) at 12 knots (22 km/h; 14 mph)
- Crew: 1,204 as flagship
- Armament: 12 × 340 mm (13.4 in) guns; 24 × 138.6 mm (5.5 in) guns; 6 × 47 mm (1.9 in) guns; 6 × 450 mm (17.7 in) torpedo tubes
- Armor: Belt: 80–300 mm (3.1–11.8 in); Turrets: 300 mm (11.8 in); Conning tower: 266 mm (10.5 in)

The Normandie class consisted of five dreadnought battleships ordered for the French Navy in 1912–1913, Normandie, the lead ship, Flandre, Gascogne, Languedoc, and Béarn. The design incorporated a radical arrangement for the twelve 340 mm (13.4 in) main battery guns: three quadruple-gun turrets, the first of their kind, as opposed to the twin-gun turrets used by most other navies. The first four ships were to be fitted with an unusual hybrid propulsion system that used both steam turbines and triple-expansion steam engines to increase fuel efficiency.

The ships were never completed due to shifting production requirements and a shortage of labor after the beginning of World War I in 1914. The first four ships were sufficiently advanced in construction to permit their launching to clear the slipways for other, more important work. Many of the guns built for the ships were converted for use by the Army. After the war, the French Navy considered several proposals to complete the ships, either as originally designed or modernized to account for lessons from the war. The weak French post-war economy forestalled these plans, and the first four ships were broken up.

The last ship, Béarn, which was not significantly advanced at the time work halted, was converted into an aircraft carrier in the 1920s. She remained in service in various capacities until the 1960s, and was ultimately scrapped in 1967.

== Development ==
Right elevation and plan drawing of the Normandie class' final design

Illustration of the twin and quadruple turret variant, which was eventually not adopted

In December 1911, the French Navy's Technical Committee (Comité technique) issued a report that examined the design of the Bretagne class that had been ordered for 1912. They concluded that the amidships gun turret was an unsatisfactory choice, based on experiences from the 1880s with blast damage on battleships from their own guns. This position influenced the construction of the next class of dreadnought battleships, for which design work began shortly thereafter.

The French Navy's design staff (Section technique) submitted the first draft of the new dreadnought design in February 1912. The size of French shipyard facilities significantly affected the design. Length was limited to 172 meters (564 ft), beam to 27.5 m (90 ft 3 in), and draft to approximately 8.7 m (29 ft). These dimensions limited the design to a displacement of around 25,000 metric tons (24,605 long tons) and a speed of 20 to 21 knots (37 to 39 km/h; 23 to 24 mph), depending on the armament arrangement.

The design staff presented three armament alternatives, all armed with a secondary armament of twenty 138.6 mm (5.5 in) guns in a new twin-gun casemate mounting. The first was a design with the same ten 340 mm guns as the Bretagnes, but with a top speed greater than 21 knots. The second was for a ship with a dozen 340 mm guns arranged in two quadruple-gun turrets fore and aft of the superstructure with superfiring twin-gun turrets and a speed of 20 knots. The last proposal was a ship that was armed with sixteen 30.5 cm (12 in) guns in four quadruple turrets and a speed of 20 knots.

The staff also prepared two design options for the propulsion system. One used two sets of direct-drive steam turbines, as in the Bretagne class; the one ultimately selected was a hybrid system that used one set of direct-drive turbines on the two inner propeller shafts, and two vertical triple-expansion steam engines (VTE) on the outer shafts for low-speed cruising. This was intended to reduce coal consumption at cruising speeds, as direct-drive turbines are very inefficient at moderate to low speeds. The fifth ship, Béarn, was instead equipped with two sets of turbines to allow her to match the fuel consumption rate of the turbine-equipped Bretagne class.

The General Staff decided in March 1912 to retain the 340 mm gun of the Bretagne class and favored the all-turbine design. They chose the new quadruple turret and preferred an armament of twelve guns in two quadruple and two double turrets. The following month, the Naval Supreme Council (Conseil supérieur de la Marine) could not reach a decision on the quadruple turret as it was still being developed, but wished to revisit the issue once it was further along. The council rejected the twin-gun casemate mounting proposed for the secondary armament and proposed a mixture of eighteen 138.6 mm and a dozen 100 mm (3.9 in) guns. It accepted the hybrid propulsion system, and the armor layout of the Bretagne class was to be retained, with an increase in the thickness of the main belt if possible. Théophile Delcassé, the Naval Minister (Minister de la Marine), accepted the council's recommendations with the proviso that the Bretagne-class arrangement of five twin turrets, including one amidships, would be substituted if the quadruple turrets were not ready in time.

The Technical Department prepared two new designs, A7, which incorporated the five twin turrets, and A7bis, with three quadruple turrets. The A7bis design was some 500 t (490 long tons) lighter than the A7 design, and on 6 April the Navy accepted a quadruple-gun-turret design submitted by Saint-Chamond. On 22 May it realized that the 100 mm gun would not ne ready by the time construction was scheduled to begin, so the design reverted to the 138.6 mm gun. Further work revealed that two additional guns could be accommodated, and the Naval Supreme Council accepted the design with twenty-four 138.6 mm guns on 8 July.

== Description ==
The Normandie-class ships were 175 m (574 ft 2 in) long at the waterline, and 176.4 m (578 ft 9 in) long overall. They had a beam of 27 m (88 ft 7 in) and a mean draft of 8.84 m (29 ft) at full load. They were intended to displace 25,250 metric tons (24,850 long tons) at normal load and 28,270 metric tons (27,820 long tons) at deep load. The ships were subdivided by transverse bulkheads into 21 watertight compartments.

The first four ships were equipped with one set of steam turbines driving the inner pair of four-bladed, 5.2 m (17 ft 1 in) propellers. Normandie and Flandre had license-built Parsons turbines, Gascogne had turbines by Rateau-Bretagne, and Languedoc's turbines were built by Schneider-Zoelly. The four ships had a pair of four-cylinder vertical triple-expansion engines that drove the two outer three-bladed, 3.34–3.44 m (10 ft 11 in – 11 ft 3 in) propellers for steaming astern or cruising at low speed. The last ship, Béarn, was equipped with two sets of Parsons turbines, each driving a pair of three-bladed, 3.34 m propellers. Normandie and Gascogne were fitted with 21 Guyot-du Temple-Normand small-tube boilers, Flandre and Languedoc were equipped with 28 Belleville large-tube boilers, while Béarn had 28 Niclausse boilers. All of the boilers operated at a pressure of 20 kg/cm^{2} (1,961 kPa; 284 psi).

The ships' engines were rated at 32,000 metric horsepower (23,536 kW; 31,562 shp) and were designed to give them a speed of 21 knots (39 km/h; 24 mph), although use of forced draft was intended to increase their output to 45,000 PS (33,097 kW; 44,384 shp) and the maximum speed to 22.5 knots (41.7 km/h; 25.9 mph). The ships were designed to carry 900 metric tons (890 long tons) of coal and 300 metric tons (300 long tons) of fuel oil, but up to 2,700 metric tons (2,700 long tons) of coal could be stored in the hull. At a cruising speed of 12 knots (22 km/h; 14 mph), the ships could steam for 6,600 nautical miles (12,200 km; 7,600 mi); at 16 knots (30 km/h; 18 mph), the range fell to 3,375 nmi (6,250 km; 3,884 mi), and at top speed, it dropped to 1,800 nmi (3,300 km; 2,100 mi). The ships would have had a crew of 44 officers and 1,160 enlisted men when serving as a flagship.

=== Armament ===
The main battery of the Normandie class consisted of a dozen 45-caliber Canon de 340 mm Modèle 1912M guns mounted in three quadruple turrets. One turret was placed forward, one amidships, and one aft, all on the centerline. The turrets weighed 1,500 t (1,476 long tons), and were electrically trained and hydraulically elevated. The guns were divided into pairs and moved together in twin cradles; a 40 mm (1.6 in)-thick bulkhead divided the turrets in half. Each pair of guns had its own ammunition hoist and magazine. They could be fired simultaneously or independently. Had the ships been completed, these would have been the first quadruple turrets in the world.

The guns had a range of 16,000 meters (17,000 yd) and a rate of fire of two rounds per minute. The shells were 540-kilogram (1,190 lb) armor-piercing rounds and were fired with a muzzle velocity of 800 meters per second (2,600 ft/s). Each gun was to have been supplied with 100 rounds of ammunition. Five 3.66 m (12 ft) rangefinders provided fire-control for the main battery. Two of the rangefinders were mounted on the conning tower and the other three were placed atop each of the turrets. The turrets also had auxiliary gunnery-control stations.

The ships would also have been armed with a secondary battery of twenty-four 55-caliber 138.6 mm Modèle 1910 guns, each singly mounted in casemates near the main-gun turrets. These guns fired a 36.5 kg (80 lb) shell at a muzzle velocity of 830 m/s (2,700 ft/s). These guns would have been supplied with 275 rounds of ammunition each. Six Canon de 47 mm (1.9 in) Modèle 1902 anti-aircraft guns, which were converted from low-angle guns, would also have been carried by the ships. The ships also would have been equipped with six underwater 450 mm (17.7 in) torpedo tubes, three on each broadside, and carried 36 torpedoes.

=== Protection ===
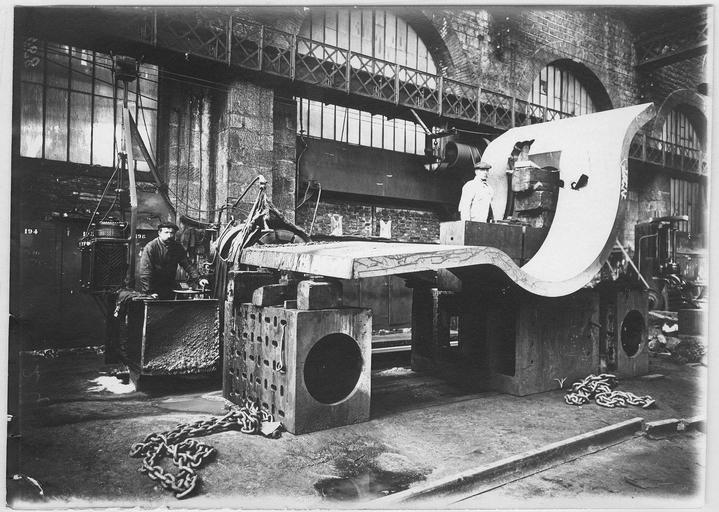
Armor plate for Normandie being manufactured in Saint-Etienne, 1916

The armor belt of the Normandie-class ships was made from Krupp cemented armor and extended almost the entire length of the hull (170 meters (557 ft 9 in)), save 5 meters (16 ft 5 in) at the stern. The belt consisted of two rows of plates that were a total of 4.05 meters (13 ft 3 in) high, of which 1.7 meters (5 ft 7 in) was below the waterline. The thickest portion of the armor protected the hull between the barbettes of the end turrets and was 300 millimeters (11.8 in) thick. Each of the upper plates was tapered to a thickness of 240 millimeters (9.4 in) at its top edge and the lower plates were tapered to 100 millimeters (3.9 in) at their bottom edge. From No. 1 barbette to the bow, the plates progressively reduced in thickness from 260 to 160 millimeters (10.2 to 6.3 in) at the bow; the upper edges also progressively reduced from 190 to 140 millimeters (7.5 to 5.5 in) while the bottom edge of these plates was 80 millimeters (3.1 in) thick. Aft of the rear turret, the armor plates were progressively reduced in thickness from 260 millimeters to 140 millimeters. Their upper edges also progressively thinned from 190 to 100 millimeters (7.5 to 3.9 in), and their lower edges were the same 80 millimeters in thickness as their forward equivalents. The aft belt terminated in a 180-millimeter (7.1 in) transverse bulkhead.

Above the waterline belt was an upper strake of 160-millimeter armor that extended between the fore and aft groups of casemates for the secondary armament. The portions of the barbettes that extended outside the upper armor were protected by 250-millimeter (9.8 in) plates, while the interior surfaces were only 50 millimeters (2 in) thick to save weight. The turrets were protected with an armor thickness of 300 millimeters on their faces, 210 millimeters (8.3 in) on the sides, and 100 millimeters on the roof. The sides of the conning tower were 266 millimeters (10.5 in) thick and its roof was also 100 millimeters thick. The lower armored deck consisted of a single 14-millimeter (0.6 in) plate of mild steel for a width of 7 meters (23 ft) along the centerline, and another layer of the same thickness was added outboard of that. The deck sloped downwards to meet the bottom of the waterline belt, and a 42-millimeter (1.7 in) plate of armor steel reinforced the sloped portion of the deck to give a total thickness of 70 millimeters (2.8 in). Two layers of 13 millimeters (0.5 in) plating made up the center of the upper armored deck, which was reinforced to a total of 80 millimeters (3.1 in) along the edges and 48 millimeters (1.9 in) above the magazine.

The hull of the Normandies had a double bottom 1.6 meters (5 ft 3 in) deep. Their propulsion machinery spaces and magazines were protected by a torpedo bulkhead that consisted of two 10-millimeter (0.4 in) layers of nickel-chrome steel plates. The outer side of the bulkhead was lined with a 10-millimeter plate of corrugated flexible steel intended to absorb the force of a torpedo detonation. Another measure intended to dissipate the force were 80-centimeter-diameter (31.5 in) tubes that extended from the double bottom to the upper armored deck, intended to divert the gases of a detonation away from the torpedo bulkhead. Concerned about the possibility of capsizing after asymmetric flooding, the design incorporated empty compartments below the waterline and outboard of the fore and aft 34-centimeter magazines, the engine rooms and the midships 138.6-millimeter magazines that were intended to be flooded if necessary to correct any list.

== Ships ==
Construction data
Ship	Builder	Laid down	Launched	In Service	Fate
Normandie	Ateliers et Chantiers de la Loire, St Nazaire	18 April 1913	19 October 1914	—	Incomplete, scrapped 1924–1925
Flandre	Arsenal de Brest, Brest	1 October 1913	20 October 1914	—	Incomplete, scrapped October 1924
Gascogne	Arsenal de Lorient, Lorient	1 October 1913	20 September 1914	—	Incomplete, scrapped 1923–1924
Languedoc	Forges et Chantiers de la Gironde, Lormont	1 May 1913	1 May 1915	—	Incomplete, scrapped June 1929
Béarn	Forges et Chantiers de la Méditerranée, La Seyne-sur-Mer	5 January 1914	15 April 1920	May 1927	Converted to an aircraft carrier, scrapped 1967

== Construction and cancellation ==
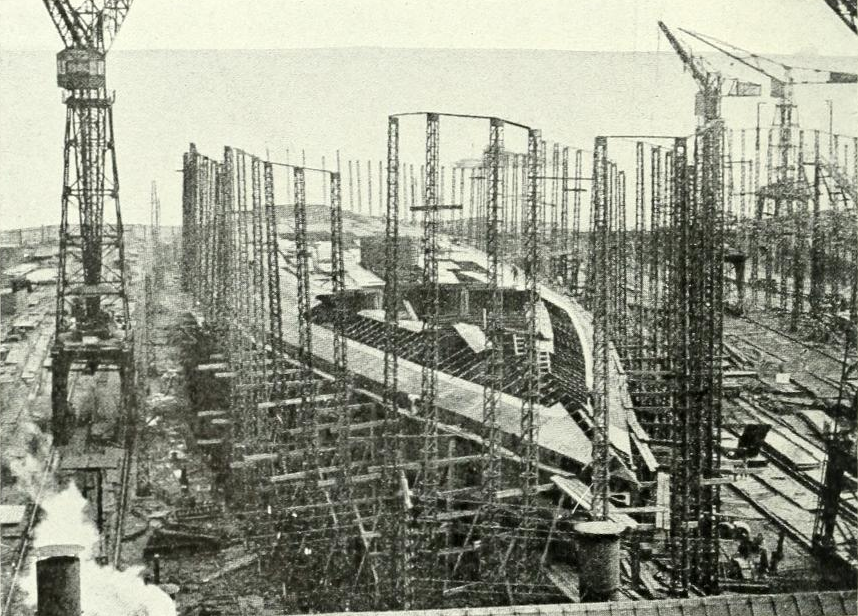
Normandie under construction

Named after provinces of France, Normandie and Languedoc were ordered on 18 April 1913, although neither was formally authorized until the enabling finance bill (loi des finances) was passed on 30 July, and Flandre and Gascogne on that same day. Béarn had been planned to be ordered on 1 October 1914, but it was brought forward to 1 January; the five ships would permit the creation of two four-ship divisions with the three Bretagne-class dreadnoughts then under construction.

Work on the class was suspended at the outbreak of World War I, as all resources were needed for the Army. The mobilization in July greatly impeded construction as workmen who were in the reserves were called up for military service, and work was effectively halted later that month. The labor force available to work on the Normandies was further reduced by conscription and orders for munitions for the Army. In light of such constraints, the navy decided that only those ships that could be completed quickly, such as the Brétagnes, would be worked upon, although sufficient construction of the first four Normandies was authorized to clear the slipways for other purposes. Construction of Béarn had been already halted on 23 July, and all further work on her was abandoned.

In July 1915 work on the ships' armament was suspended, save the guns themselves, which could be converted for use by the Army. Four of the completed 340 mm guns were converted into railway guns for the French Army. Nine of the guns built for Languedoc were also mounted on railway carriages in 1919, after the end of the war. Several of the 138.6 mm guns were also modified for service with the Army.

Progress when abandoned
Ship	Hull	Engines	Boilers	Moving parts of turrets
Normandie	65%	70%	Delivered	40%
Languedoc	49%	73%	96%	26%
Flandre	65%	60%	Delivered	51%
Gascogne	60%	Turbines 44%; VTE 75%	Delivered	Captured
Béarn	25%	17%	20%	8–10%

The boilers intended for Normandie and Gascogne were used to replace the worn-out boilers of various destroyers, namely the Aventurier-class destroyers purchased from Argentina in 1914 and the three Aetos-class ships seized from the Royal Hellenic Navy in late 1916. The boilers built for Flandre were installed in new anti-submarine ships. The armor-plate and turntables for Gascogne's turrets had been ordered from Fives-Lille, whose factory was captured by the Germans in 1914. They were discovered in one of Krupp's factories in Germany in 1921, and returned to the Navy.

In January 1918, a final wartime order specified that the ships remained suspended, but that all material that had been stockpiled for work would remain in place. By that time, some 3,086 t (3,037 long tons) of steel plating that had been earmarked for Gascogne had been taken for other uses.

On 22 November, days after the Armistice with Germany, the design staff sent the General Staff a proposal to complete the first four Normandies to a modified design. The General Staff replied that the ships would need a top speed of 26 to 28 kn (48 to 52 km/h; 30 to 32 mph) and a more powerful main battery. Since the dockyard facilities had not been enlarged during the war, the size of the ships could not be significantly increased. This allowed only modest improvements, particularly for the installation of anti-torpedo bulges. In February 1919, the General Staff decided that the ships would be completed anyway, because new vessels incorporating the lessons of the war could not be completed for at least six to seven years due to the lengthy design studies required.

The Technical Department created a revised design that incorporated some improvements. The machinery for the four ships that had been launched during the war would be retained; increasing their speed to 24 knots (44 km/h; 28 mph) required a corresponding increase to 80,000 shp (60,000 kW), which could be obtained by building more powerful turbines. The elevation of the main guns was to be increased to 23–24 degrees, which would increase the range of the guns to 25,000 m (82,000 ft) to avoid being outranged by foreign battleships. The need to engage targets at longer ranges was confirmed by the examination of one of the ex-Austrian Tegetthoff-class ships that had been surrendered to France at the end of the war. The main armored deck was to be increased to 120 mm (4.7 in) to increase resistance to plunging fire. The submerged 450 mm torpedo tubes were to be replaced with deck-mounted 550 mm (21.7 in) tubes, and fire-control equipment was to be improved. Equipment for handling a two-seat reconnaissance aircraft and a single-seat fighter was also to be installed.

After the war, Vice Admiral Pierre Ronarc'h became Chief of the General Staff, and in July 1919 he argued that the Italian Navy was the country's primary naval rival, and that they might resume work on the Francesco Caracciolo-class battleships that had been suspended during the war. He suggested there were three options for the first four Normandies: complete them as designed, increase the range of their guns and improve their armor, or lengthen their hull and install new engines to increase speed. The Technical Department determined that lengthening the hulls by 15 m (49 ft) could increase speed by as much as 5 kn (9.3 km/h; 5.8 mph). Nevertheless, by 12 September 1919, Ronarc'h had decided that completing the ships would be too expensive for the fragile French economy. Plans for the first four ships included converting them into cargo ships, oil tankers, or passenger liners, or using them as floating oil depots, but these ideas were ultimately rejected. The ships were formally cancelled in the 1922 construction program, and were laid up in Landevennec and cannibalized for parts before being broken up in 1923–1926. Much of the salvaged material was incorporated into completing Béarn and in modernizing the battleship Courbet.

Plans to complete Béarn included replacement of the coal-fired boilers with eight oil-fired Niclausse boilers and new, more powerful turbines. A new quadruple turret that allowed greater range was considered, along with twin turrets mounting 400 mm (16 in) guns. The battleship was launched on 15 April 1920 to clear the slipway. A temporary 43 m × 9 m (141 ft × 30 ft) wooden platform was built atop the lower armored deck later that year to serve as a flight deck for aircraft landing trials. Transverse arresting wires that were weighted by sandbags were improvised, and the evaluation successfully took place off Toulon in late 1920. In 1922, the Navy instead decided to complete the ship as an aircraft carrier. Conversion work began in August 1923, and was completed by May 1927 using the hybrid propulsion system from Normandie with a dozen Normand boilers. The ship was the first carrier of the French Navy. She served in the fleet through World War II, generally being used as a ferry for aircraft; she did not see any combat as she spent most of the war in the Caribbean in the island of Martinique. In 1944, she was refitted in the United States and equipped with a battery of modern American anti-aircraft guns. She remained in service through the First Indochina War, still as an aircraft ferry. The ship was ultimately broken up for scrap in 1967.
