= Bretagne-class battleship =

French class of super-dreadnoughts

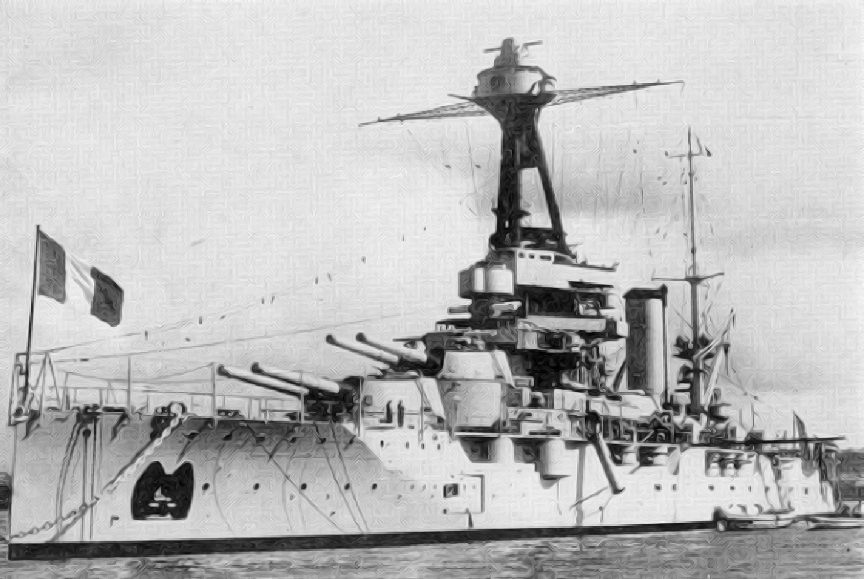
- Provence in harbor

Class overview
- Builders: Arsenal de Brest; Arsenal de Lorient; Ateliers et Chantiers de la Loire
- Preceded by: Courbet class
- Succeeded by: Normandie class (planned); Dunkerque class (actual)
- Built: 1912–1916
- In commission: 1916–1953
- Planned: 4
- Completed: 3
- Lost: 2
- Retired: 1

General characteristics
- Type: Battleship
- Displacement: Normal: 23,936 metric tons (23,558 long tons); Full load: 26,000 metric tons (26,000 long tons)
- Length: 166 m (544 ft 7 in)
- Beam: 26.9 m (88 ft 3 in)
- Draft: 9.8 m (32 ft 2 in)
- Installed power: 18–24 boilers; 29,000 shp (22,000 kW)
- Propulsion: 4 shafts; steam turbines
- Speed: 20 knots (37 km/h; 23 mph)
- Range: 4,600 nmi (8,500 km; 5,300 mi) at 10 knots (19 km/h; 12 mph)
- Crew: 34 officers; 139 petty officers; 1,020 enlisted
- Armament: 10 × 340mm/45 Modèle 1912 guns; After 1935 (Lorraine only); 8 × 340 mm/45 Modèle 1912 guns; 22 × 1 138.6 mm Mle 1910 guns; 4 × 47-millimetre (1.9 in) guns; 4 × 450 mm (17.7 in) torpedo tubes; After 1935: 14 × 1 138.6 mm Mle 1910 guns; 8 × 75mm/50 Modèle 1922 guns
- Armor: Belt: 270 mm (10.6 in); Decks: 40 mm (1.6 in); Conning tower: 314 mm (12.4 in); Turrets: 340 mm (13.4 in); Casemates: 170 mm (6.7 in)

The Bretagne-class battleships were the first "super-dreadnoughts" built for the French Navy during the First World War. The class comprised three vessels: Bretagne, the lead ship, Provence, and Lorraine. They were an improvement of the previous Courbet class, and mounted ten 340 mm (13.4 in) guns instead of twelve 305 mm (12 in) guns as on the Courbets. A fourth was ordered by the Greek Navy, though work was suspended due to the outbreak of the war. The three completed ships were named after French provinces.

The three ships saw limited service during World War I, and were primarily occupied with containing the Austro-Hungarian Navy in the Adriatic Sea. After the war, they conducted training cruises in the Mediterranean and participated in non-intervention patrols off Spain during the Spanish Civil War. After the outbreak of World War II, the ships were tasked with convoy duties and anti-commerce raider patrols until the fall of France in June 1940. Bretagne and Provence were sunk by the British Royal Navy during the Attack on Mers-el-Kébir the following month; Provence was later raised and towed to Toulon, where she was again scuttled in November 1942. Lorraine was disarmed by the British in Alexandria and recommissioned in 1942 to serve with the Free French Naval Forces. She provided gunfire support during Operation Dragoon, the invasion of southern France, and shelled German fortresses in northern France. She survived as a gunnery training ship and a floating barracks until the early 1950s, before being broken up for scrap in 1954. Bretagne and Provence were scrapped in 1952 and 1949, respectively.

== Design ==
By 1910, France had yet to lay down a single dreadnought battleship; Britain had by then completed ten dreadnoughts and five battlecruisers, with eight and three more of the two types, respectively, under construction. Germany had built eight dreadnoughts and one battlecruiser and the United States had six built and four more building. Late that year, the French Navy laid down the first of the four Courbet class ships. To remedy the inferiority of the French fleet, the government passed the Statut Naval on 30 March 1912, authorizing a force of twenty-eight battleships, to be in service by 1920. The first three ships were to be laid down in 1912.

The Bretagne class were replacements for the battleships Carnot, Charles Martel and Liberté. They were developed from the Courbet class, and were built with the same hulls. The primary reason for the decision to use the same hull design as the Courbet class was limitations of French shipyards. The Courbet-class ships were the largest possible ships that could fit in existing dockyards and refitting basins. The Superior Naval Council (Conseil supérieur de la Marine) ordered the construction department to prepare designs for a 23,500-metric-ton (23,100-long-ton; 25,900-short-ton) ship armed with twelve 340 mm (13.4 in) guns in six twin gun turrets.

The additional weight of the 340 mm turrets compared to the 305 mm (12 in) of the Courbet-class ships imposed insurmountable problems for the designers. To incorporate six turrets with the same arrangement of the earlier vessels, with four on the centerline in superfiring pairs and two wing turrets amidships would have required an additional 3,000 metric tons (3,000 long tons) displacement as well as a significant increase in the length of the hull. After several other proposals, the Superior Naval Council chose a design with five twin turrets, all mounted on the centerline. This would achieve the same broadside of ten guns, despite the reduction in the number of guns. The width of the armored belt was reduced by 20 mm (0.79 in) to compensate for the increased weight of the main battery.

Provence was the first ship of the class to be laid down, which she was on 21 May 1912 at the Arsenal de Lorient. Bretagne was laid down at the Arsenal de Brest shipyard in Brest on 22 July 1912. Lorraine followed at the Ateliers et Chantiers de la Loire shipyard in St. Nazaire almost six months later on 7 November 1912. Due to the outbreak of World War I in the summer of 1914, French industrial capacity was redirected to the army and work slowed on the ships. The Greek Navy ordered a battleship to be named Vasilefs Konstantinos to the same design from AC de St Nazaire Penhoet. Work began in June 1914 but ceased on the outbreak of war in August and never resumed. The contract dispute was settled in 1925.

=== General characteristics ===
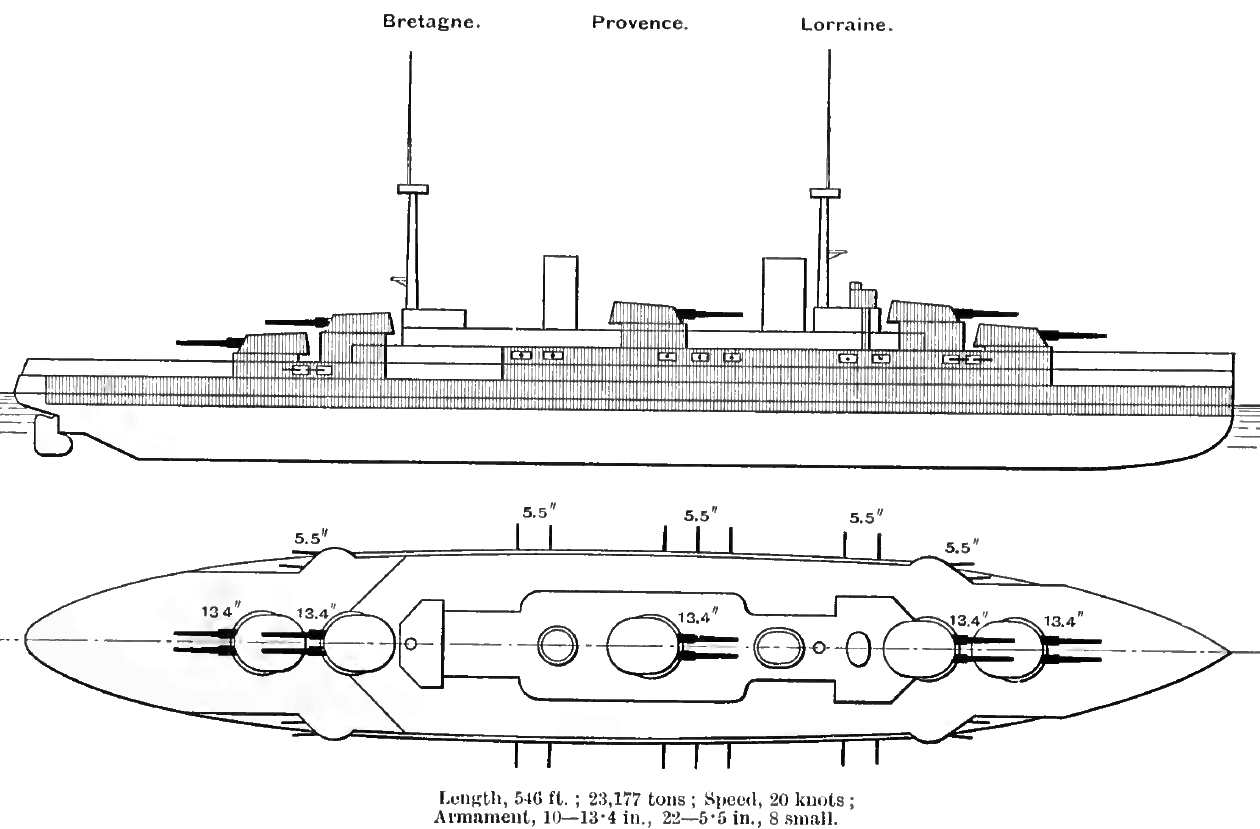
As depicted in Brassey's Naval Annual 1915

The ships were 164.9 meters (541 ft) long at the waterline and 166 m (545 ft) long overall. They had a beam of 26.9 m (88 ft) and a draft of between 8.9 m (29 ft) and 9.8 m (32 ft). At the designed load, the ships displaced 23,936 metric tons (23,558 long tons), and at full combat load, this increased to 26,000 metric tons (26,000 long tons). The crew included 34 officers, 139 petty officers, and 1,020 enlisted men, for a total crew of 1,193. The vessels carried a number of smaller boats, including two 10 m (33 ft) steamboats, three 11 m (36 ft) patrol boats, one 13 m (43 ft) long boat, three 10.5 m (34 ft) dinghies, two 5 m (16 ft) dinghies, two 8.5 m (28 ft) whaleboats, and two 5.6 m (18 ft) lifeboats.

The ships' propulsion systems consisted of four Parsons steam turbines. Bretagne was equipped with twenty-four Niclausse boilers; Lorraine had the same number of Guyot du Temple boilers. Provence was equipped with eighteen Belleville boilers. All three ships were coal-fired. The turbines each drove a single screw and were rated at a total of 29,000 shaft horsepower (22,000 kW). This provided a top speed of 20 knots (37 km/h; 23 mph). The four ships could carry 900 t (890 long tons; 990 short tons) of coal, though additional spaces could be used for coal storage, for up to 2,680 t (2,640 long tons; 2,950 short tons). At maximum speed, the ships could steam for 600 nautical miles (1,100 km; 690 mi); at 13 kn (24 km/h; 15 mph), the range increased significantly to 2,800 nmi (5,200 km; 3,200 mi) A further reduction in speed to 10 kn (19 km/h; 12 mph) correspondingly increased the range to 4,600 nmi (8,500 km; 5,300 mi).

The ships were modified several times in the interwar period. In 1919, Bretagne was equipped with a heavy tripod mast; Provence and Lorraine were given tripod masts in the early 1920s. Four of Bretagne's boilers were converted to oil-firing in 1924, and half of Provence's boilers in the rear boiler room were similarly converted in 1927. Bretagne subsequently had six new oil-fired boilers to replace the rest of the old coal-fired boilers, and her direct drive turbines were replaced with Parsons geared turbines. Provence was similarly modified in 1931–1934. Lorraine's propulsion system was improved in a similar pattern. In 1935, Lorraine had her center main battery turret replaced with an aircraft catapult and a hangar for three aircraft. These were initially Gourdou-Leseurre GL-819 and Potez 452 seaplanes, though they were replaced with the Loire 130 flying boat. In March–May 1944, the aircraft installation was removed.

=== Armament ===
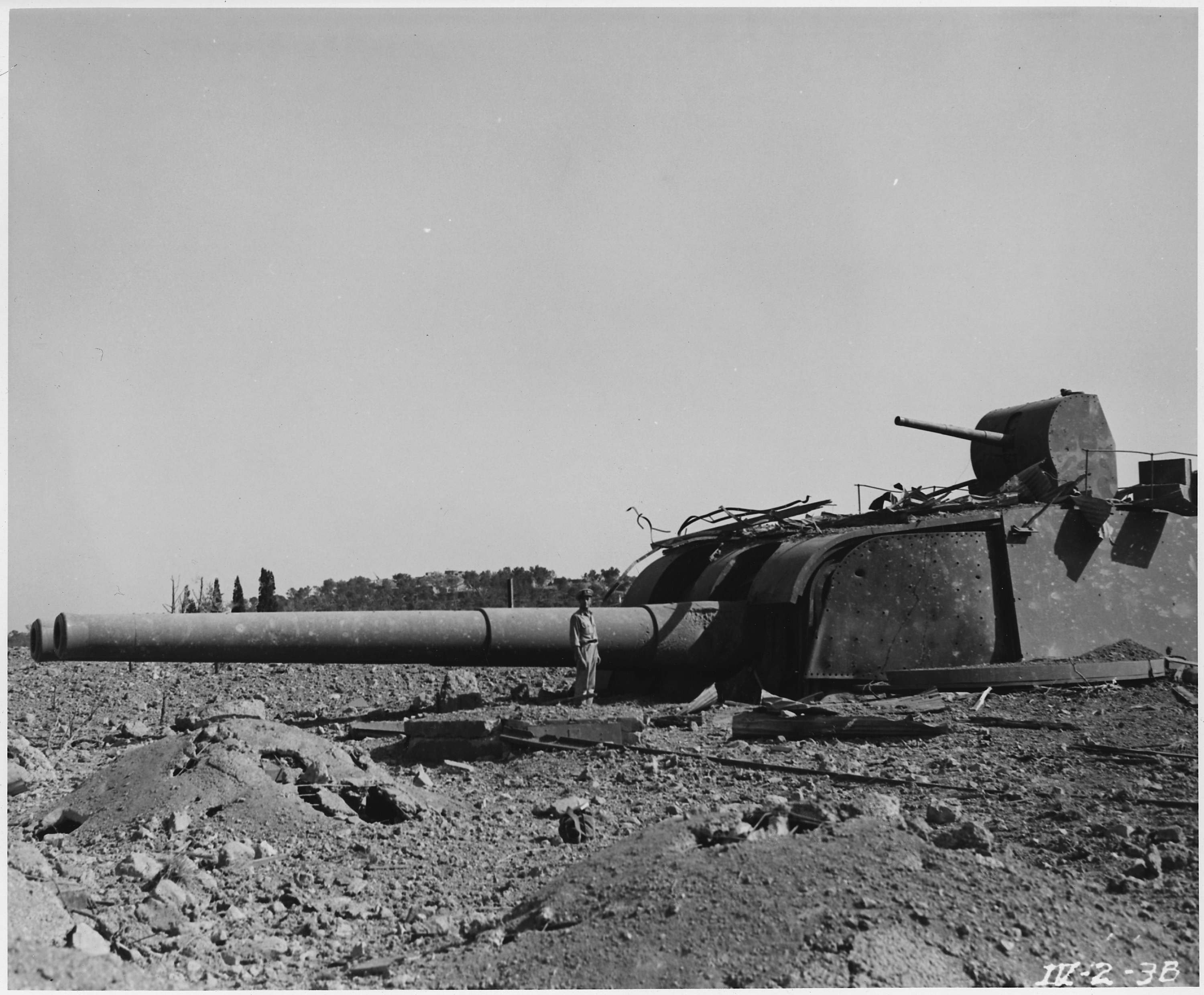
One of Provence's turrets used as a shore battery

The ship's main battery consisted of ten 340mm/45 Modèle 1912 guns in five twin gun turrets. The turrets were mounted all on the centerline, with two in a superfiring pair forward of the conning tower, one amidships between the two funnels, and two superfiring aft of the rear superstructure. These guns had a maximum elevation of 12 degrees, with a range of 14,500 m (15,900 yd); this was a result of the Council's belief that the decisive battle range would only be 6,000 m (6,600 yd) and that fleets would not engage at ranges longer than 8,000 m (8,700 yd). Lorraine was modified in 1917 to increase the elevation of the guns to 18 degrees, which correspondingly increased the range to 21,100 m (69,200 ft). Bretagne and Provence were similarly modified after the end of the war in 1919. Each gun was supplied with 100 rounds of ammunition, stored in shell rooms located beneath the propellant magazines.

A secondary battery of twenty-two Canon de 138 mm Modèle 1910 guns were mounted in casemates along the length of the ship's hull. They were expected to be used offensively to attack the upper works of enemy battleships, as well as to defend against torpedo boat attacks. The secondary battery fire control consisted of two central directors four rangefinders, which were located abreast of the superfiring turrets, fore and aft. The ships carried seven 47 mm M1885 Hotchkiss quick-firing guns. Two were placed on the conning tower and one was placed on each main battery turret. During World War I, a pair of 75 mm (3 in) guns were added. The ships' armament were rounded out by four 450 mm (17.7 in) torpedo tubes. The tubes were submerged in the ships' hulls.

In the interwar period, all three ships had their armament rearranged. In 1919–1920, Bretagne had the four forwardmost of her 138 mm guns removed, along with the 75 mm and two of the 47 mm guns. In their place, four 75 mm mle 1897 guns were installed on the forward superstructure. Twenty-four 8 mm (0.31 in) Hotchkiss machine guns were installed on the forecastle deck in 1927. The four rearmost 138 mm guns were removed during this refit, along with the 75 mm guns, which were replaced with eight 75 mm mle 1922 anti-aircraft guns. Sixteen 13.2 mm Hotchkiss machine guns, in quadruple mounts, were also added. Provence had her four forward 138 mm guns removed in 1919, and was equipped similarly to Bretagne. In 1931–1934, she received the same eight 75 mm guns as Bretagne did, and in 1940, three quadruple mounts of 13.2 mm guns were fitted. Lorraine followed a similar pattern, though in 1935, her center main battery turret was removed; an aircraft catapult was fitted in its place. At this time, four 100 mm (3.9 in) Model M1930 guns were added, along with two of the 13.2 mm quadruple mounts. In 1940, the 100 mm guns were removed to arm the new battleship Richelieu, and eight 75 mm M1922 guns replaced them. In March–May 1944, fourteen 40 mm (1.6 in) and twenty-five 20 mm (0.79 in) guns in single mounts were added, and the quadruple 13.2 mm guns were removed.

=== Fire control ===
The Bretagnes were provided with 4.57-meter (15.0 ft) Barr and Stroud rangefinders. Each turret had 2-metre (6 ft 7 in) rangefinder under an armored hood at the rear of the turret. Between the wars, fire-control directors were added for the main, secondary and anti-aircraft armament. The rangefinder on the forward superfiring turret was replaced by a 8.2-metre (27 ft) instrument.

=== Armor ===
The ships' main armored belt was 270 mm (11 in) thick amidships and reduced to 160 mm (6.3 in) on either end of the ship. Above the belt, the secondary battery casemates were armored with 170 mm (6.7 in) thick steel plate. Horizontal protection consisted of three armored decks; the main deck was 30 to 40 mm (1.2 to 1.6 in) thick. The upper and lower decks were both 40 mm thick. Sloped armor 70 mm (2.8 in) thick connected the main deck to the armored belt. Each of the main battery barbettes that housed the lower turret assemblies were armored with 248 mm (9.8 in) thick steel. The forward-most and rear-most turrets had 340 mm (13 in) thick sides. The superfiring turrets were less well protected, with 270 mm thick sides. The amidships turret was the most heavily armored, with 400 mm (16 in) thick sides. The conning tower was protected with 314 mm (12.4 in) thick armor plating. The total weight of armor was 7,614 t (7,494 long tons; 8,393 short tons).

== Ships ==
Construction data
Ship	Builder	Laid down	Launched	In Service	Fate
Bretagne	Arsenal de Brest, Brest	22 July 1912	21 April 1913	10 February 1916	Sunk by the Royal Navy at Mers-el-Kébir, 4 July 1940
Lorraine	Ateliers et Chantiers de la Loire, Saint-Nazaire	7 November 1912	30 September 1913	10 March 1916	Scrapped beginning January 1954
Provence	Arsenal de Lorient, Lorient	21 May 1912	20 April 1913	1 March 1916	Scuttled at Toulon, 27 November 1942; Refloated, 11 July 1943; Scuttled at Toulon a second time, 1944. The Germans sank her remaining hull as a blockship after stripping her of everything in 1943.; Wreckage scrapped in 1949
Vasilefs Konstantinos	Ateliers et Chantiers de la Loire, Saint-Nazaire	12 June 1914			Work halted, August 1914

== Service history ==
All three ships of the class entered service with the French Navy in 1916. Bretagne and Lorraine were assigned to the 1st Division of the 1st Battle Squadron, while Provence served as the fleet flagship for the entirety of the First World War. They were deployed to guard the southern end of the Adriatic Sea, based in Argostoli and Corfu, to block a possible sortie by the Austro-Hungarian fleet. The three ships largely remained in port, though Provence was repeatedly used to intimidate the government of Greece, which favored Germany during the war. In January 1919, after the end of the war, Lorraine was sent to Cattaro to guard the Austro-Hungarian fleet. She joined her sisters in Toulon in June 1919; later that year the ships formed the Eastern Mediterranean Fleet until 1921.

Financial problems forced the French Navy to reduce its battleship force to four active vessels. Lorraine and Provence were reduced to reserve status in 1922, and the latter went into drydock for a major overhaul. Lorraine returned to service with the Mediterranean Squadron in 1923. Bretagne remained in service and conducted training cruises in the Mediterranean and along the coast of North Africa during the 1920s and 1930s. In 1934, Bretagne and Provence were assigned to the 2nd Squadron, based on France's Atlantic coast. In 1936, they joined the non-intervention patrols off Spain during the Spanish Civil War. At the outbreak of World War II in September 1939, Bretagne and Provence were based in Toulon with the 2nd Squadron, while Lorraine was assigned to the Atlantic Squadron.

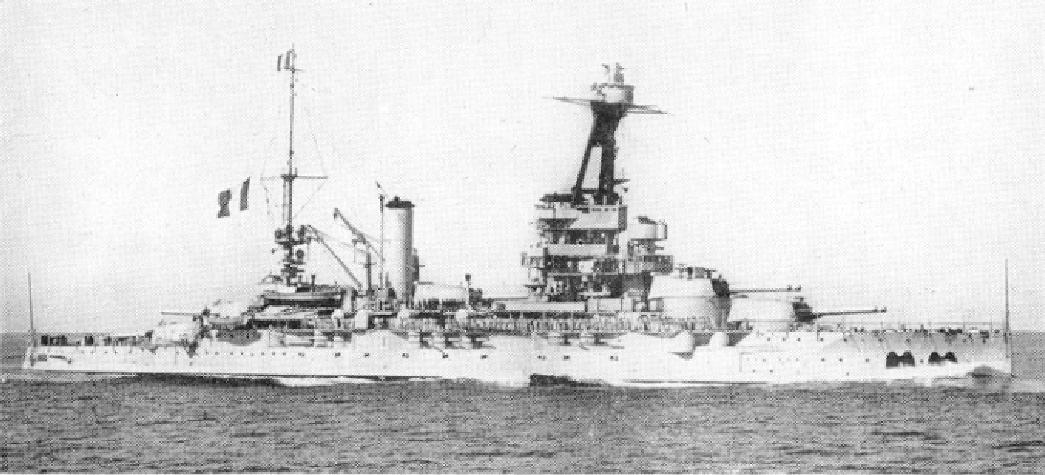
US Navy recognition photo of Provence

After undergoing a refit in the early months of the war, Provence conducted anti-raider patrols with Force Y, based in Casablanca. Bretagne was also overhauled early in the war; in March 1940 she escorted a convoy to Halifax and returned with another convoy loaded with aircraft for the French Air Force. She was then ordered to join Lorraine in Force X, to be based in Alexandria to operate in concert with the British Mediterranean Fleet. Two weeks later, Bretagne was instead ordered to steam at high speed to Bizerte, to join the Force de Raid with Provence. The ships put in at Mers-el-Kébir and remained there until after the fall of France in June 1940. To prevent the ships of the French Navy from falling into the hands of the occupying Germans, British Prime Minister Winston Churchill ordered the neutralization of all French warships. Force H was to deliver an ultimatum to the ships based at Mers-el-Kébir; on 3 July, the British squadron arrived outside the harbor and demanded that the ships sail with them to Britain or they would be sunk.

The British and French negotiated for several hours, and culminated in the British opening fire on the French fleet. In the span of ten minutes, Bretagne was sunk and Provence was badly damaged. Bretagne was hit by at least four 15 in (380 mm) shells from HMS Hood, Resolution and Valiant and exploded, killing the vast majority of her crew. Provence was set on fire and sank to the bottom of the harbor, though she was subsequently raised and transferred to Toulon, where she was later scuttled in 1942 to prevent her from being seized by the Germans. They nevertheless salvaged the ship starting in July 1943. Two of her main guns were emplaced as coastal batteries outside Toulon. Lorraine was disarmed in Alexandria until December 1942, when she joined the Free French Naval Forces. She served as a training ship for much of 1943 until a major refit at the end of the year to prepare her to participate in Operation Dragoon, the invasion of southern France. She provided gunfire support during the landings before steaming to Britain for a minor refit. She remained in Britain until March 1945, when she bombarded German-held fortresses in northern France.

After the end of the war, Lorraine served as a gunnery training ship in Toulon. She was then used as a barracks ship until February 1953, when she was stricken from the naval register and sold for scrapping at the end of the year. She was broken up for scrap outside Toulon the following year. Bretagne remained at the bottom of Mers-el-Kébir until she was raised for scrapping in 1952 and broken up. Provence was raised in April 1949 and scrapped.
