= Compagnie des forges et aciéries de la marine et d'Homécourt =

French manufacturing company

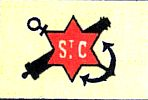
- Industry: Iron and steel manufacture
- Predecessor: Compagnie des Fonderies, Forges et Aciéries de Saint-Etienne
- Founded: Saint-Chamond, Loire, France (14 November 1854)
- Headquarters: Saint-Chamond, Loire, France
- Products: Iron and steel

The Compagnie des forges et aciéries de la marine et d'Homécourt ('Company of Marine Forges and Steelworks and of Homécourt'; FAMH) was a French industrial enterprise that made iron and steel products for the French navy, army, and railroads. It is often known as Saint-Chamond from its main location in Saint-Chamond, Loire.

== Origins ==
In 1815 James Jackson, a manufacturer from Birmingham, England, set a steelworks near Saint-Étienne at Trablaine. Jackson returned to England around 1823. His sons, naturalized Frenchmen, established an important steelworks at Assailly in 1830. In 1837 H. Pétin and J. M. Gaudet, mechanics and forgers, set up shops at Saint-Chamond and Rive-de-Gier. In 1841 Pétin et Gaudet introduced one of the first steam hammers at their works. Later they introduced innovations such as a mobile crane for moving large pieces around the works, and a hydraulic press. Starting in 1771 the Neyrand brothers became owners of several coal mines and ironworks in the valley of the Gier river. The company of Neyrand frères et Thiollière was formed in January 1845 to exploit an enlarged and modernized factory at Lorette. The partnership of Parent, Schaken, Goldsmid et Cie was formed on 28 February 1854 to acquire and exploit the forges of the Vierzon company located at Vierzon, Clavières, Reblay, Bonneau and Courbançon.

These four companies became one on 14 November 1854 when Jackson Frères and Pétin et Gaudet merged and combined with Neyrand-Thiollière, Bergeron et Cie of Lorette, and Parent, Schaken, Goldsmid et Cie of Paris. The new company was called the Compagnie des Hauts-fourneaux, forges et aciéries de la Marine et des chemins de fer. The company, which engaged in extracting, processing and selling iron and coal was initially based in Rive-de-Gier. On 9 November 1871 it moved its headquarters to Saint-Chamond and became a limited company. The factories were mainly concentrated in the Loire basin, in Saint-Chamond and Assailly.

== Early years ==
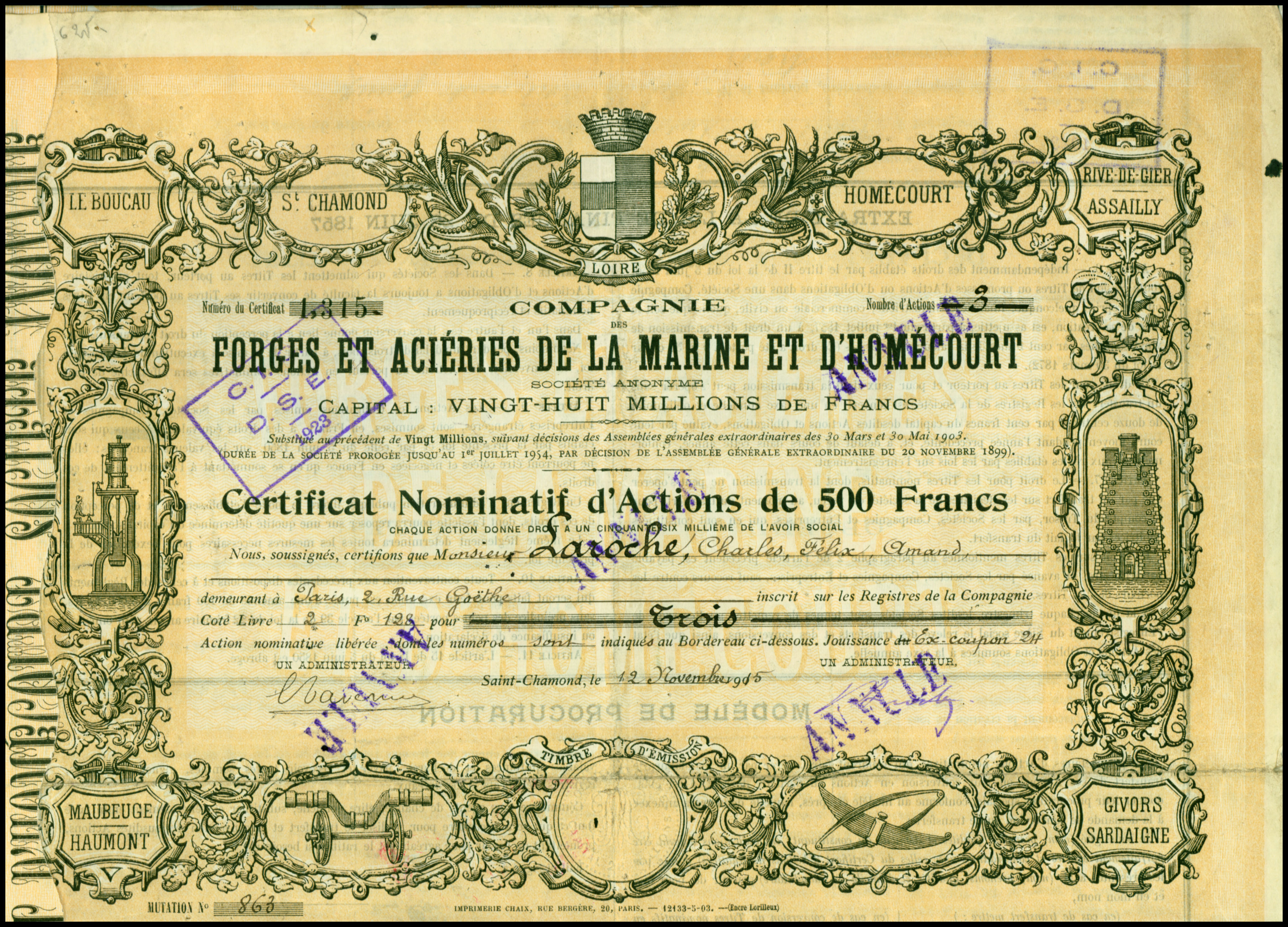
Share of the Comp. des Forges et Aciéries de la Marine et d'Homécourt SA, issued 12. November 1915

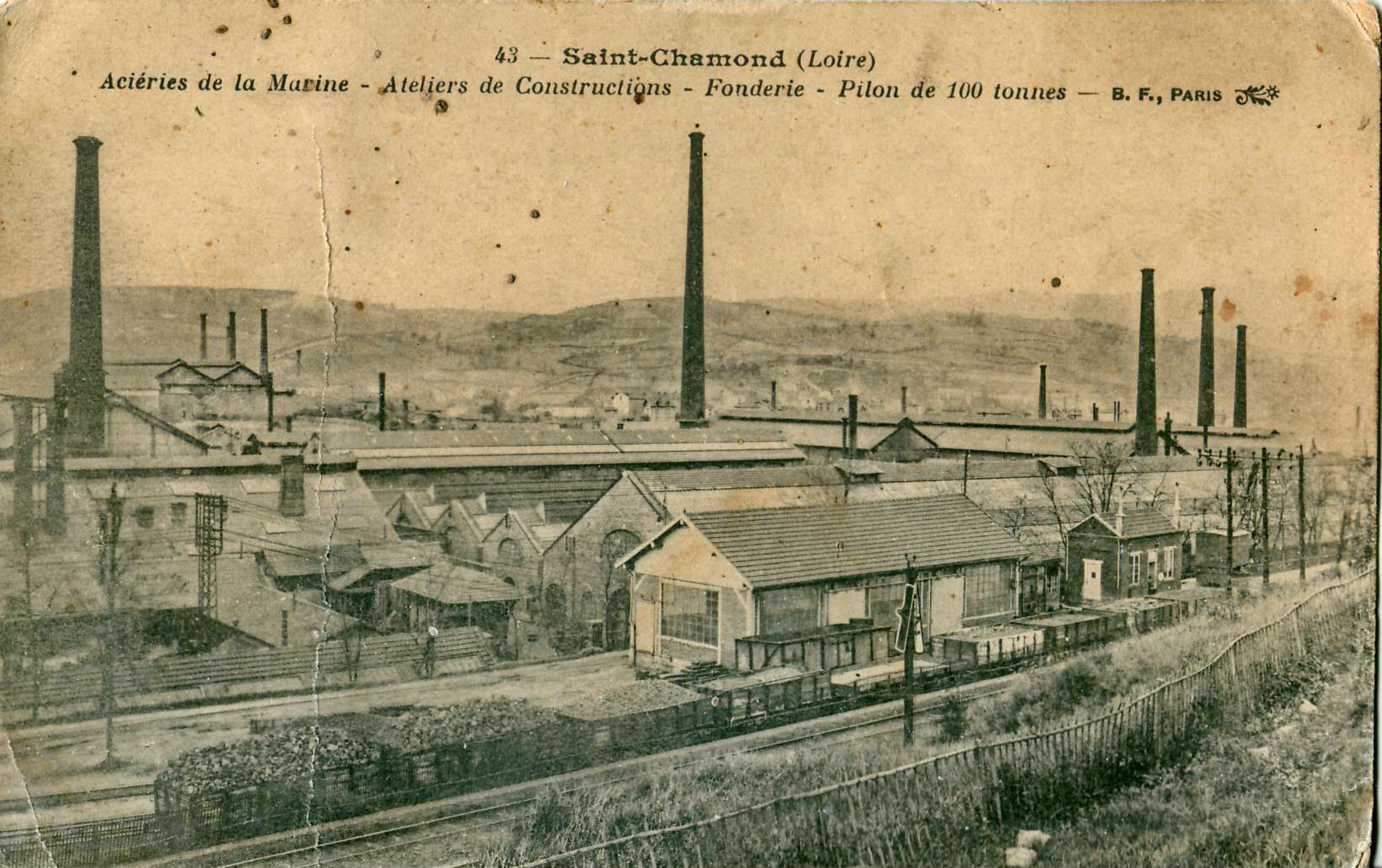
Pre-1914 postcard of the works at Saint-Chamond, Loire

In 1874 the Company was struggling in a difficult economy. Pierre de Montgolfier-Verpilleux was named general director. Montgolfier remained head of the company for most of the rest of his life. When he took office in 1874 the annual sales turnover was 20 million francs, and at the end of his tenure in 1908 it had risen to 80 million francs. He paid particular attention to the works at Saint-Chamond and Assailly, where he developed the special fabrications that brought fame to the factories. At Saint-Chamond he built a forge that could make 80-ton ingots, and he installed a great steam hammer with a 100-ton ram.

He developed arms manufacture at Saint-Chamond, and also delivered large quantities of rails to major French railroad companies. In 1881 he founded the Forges du Boucau near Bayonne. The factory at Boucau in the Hautes-Pyrénées was created when the Midi rail network decided to replace its iron rails with steel. Between 1887 and 1890 he built huge workshops which, among other products, made most of the land turrets that armed the eastern fortresses of France, and provided turrets to various foreign powers, particularly Romania. The forges also produced train shields and marine turrets.

In 1903 the company moved into the east and north when it acquired the assets of the Vezin-Aulnoye company, which included factories at Homécourt in Meurthe-et-Moselle and iron mines at Hautmont in the north. The name was changed to Compagnie des forges et aciéries de la Marine et d'Homécourt.

== World War I ==
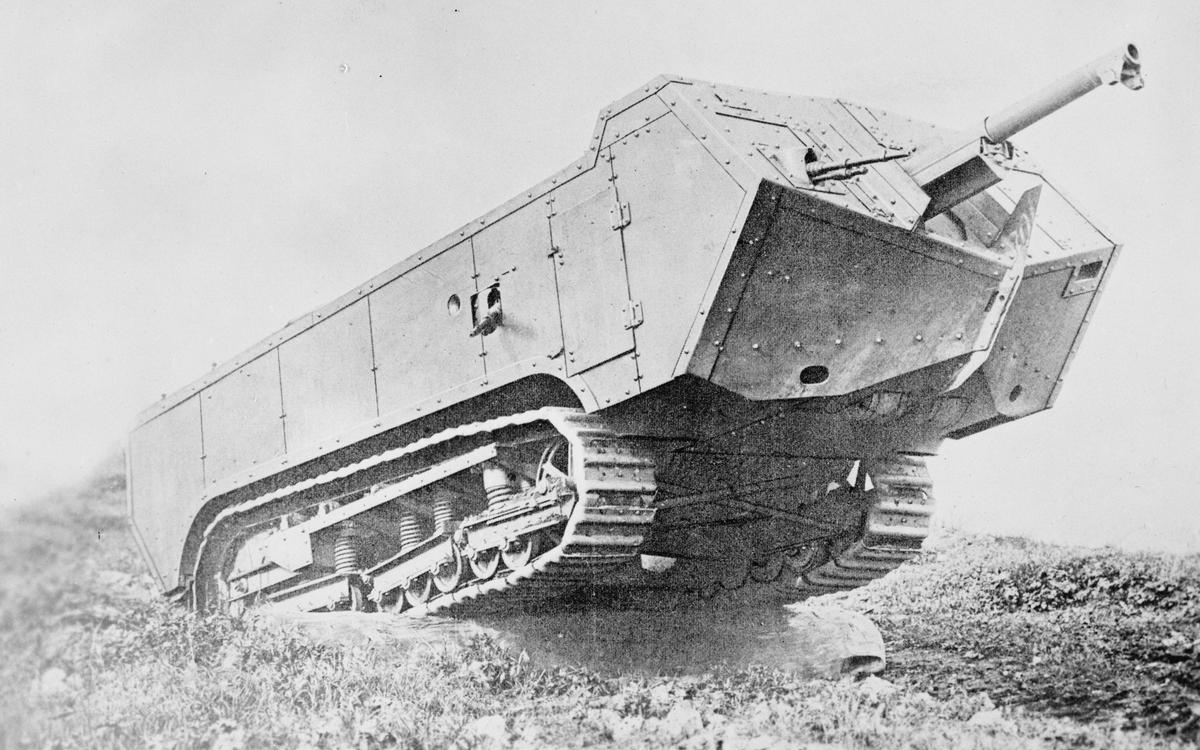
The Saint-Chamond (tank) showing the overhanging front hull and the later M.1897 75 mm field gun

During World War I (1914-1918) the company built several different types of weapons, notably the Saint Chamond-Mondragón 75 mm gun which had been designed mostly by colonel Rimailho, the Saint-Chamond tank and the deficient Chauchat machine rifle. They also produced naval guns, such as the quadruple gun turret design for the unfinished Normandie-class battleships.

== Later mergers ==
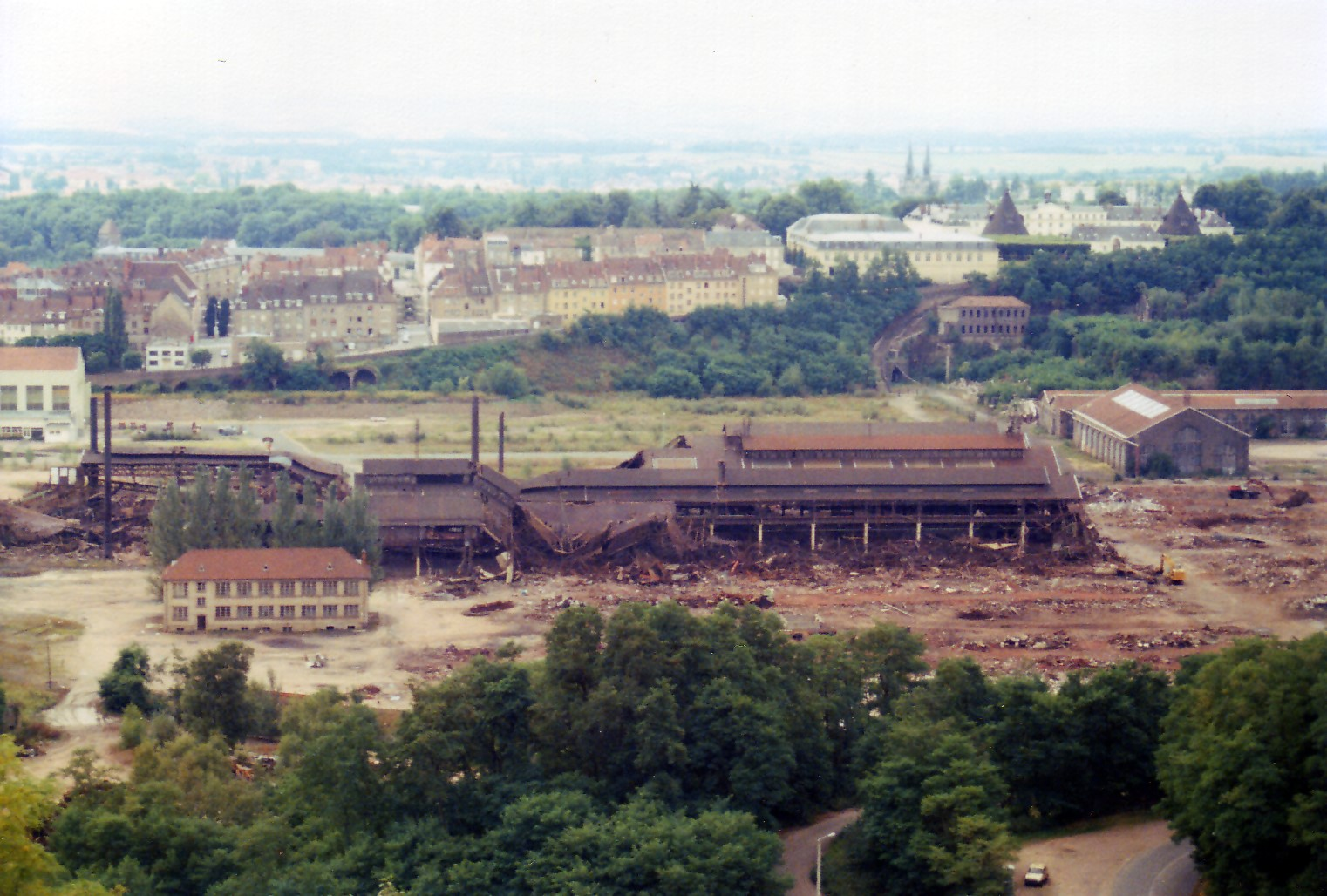
Destruction of the Creusot-Loire factories in 1985.

In 1932 the company purchased the Neyrand et Cie company with a plant at Onzion, Loire. The company went through major changes after World War II (1939-1945). In 1950 the properties in the east and north were transferred to the Lorraine company SIDELOR, and the company returned to its focus in the Loire region. In 1952 it merged with the Compagnie des Aciéries de Saint-Étienne to form the Compagnie des Forges et Aciéries de la Marine et Saint-Étienne.

In 1954 the company became a holding company, combining its industrial operations with the Établissements Jacob Holtzer and Usine de la Loire des Aciéries et Forges de Firminy to create the Compagnie des Ateliers et Forges de la Loire (CAFL). The company went through further transformations in 1961 by merging with Firminy, which had also become a holding company, to form the Compagnie des forges et aciéries de la Marine, Firminy et Saint Etienne. This became Marine-Firminy in 1968. That year SNCF Class A1AA1A 68000 production was over, and that signified the end of locomotive production of the company.

In March 1970 the latter company merged with Société des forges et ateliers du Creusot to form Creusot-Loire holding. 1973 oil embargo caused a steel crisis, and in 1974 French government nationalized the steel industry.

Marine-Wendel was created by acquiring most of the industrial and commercial interests of the Lorraine company.
