= Conseil supérieur de la Marine =

The Conseil supérieur de la Marine (French pronunciation: [kɔ̃sɛj sypeʁjœʁ də la maʁin], Superior Naval Council, abbr. CSM) was an advisory body to the Minister of the Navy that was formed on 5 December 1889. It consisted of the Chief of the Naval Staff, the Directeur du matérial (Director of Equipment), the Directeur de l'artillerie and various admirals. "The CSM advised the minister on the military characteristics of new designs and drew up the staff requirements including displacement, offensive/defensive qualities, speed and endurance."

== Bibliography ==
- Guelton, Frédéric (1999). "Les hautes instances de la Défense nationale sous la Troisième République". In Forcade, Olivier; Duhamel, Eric & Vial, Philippe (eds.). Militaires en République (1870–1962): les officiers, le pouvoir et la vie publique en France (in French). Publications de la Sorbonne.
- Jordan, John & Caresse, Philippe (2017). French Battleships of World War One. Annapolis, Maryland: Naval Institute Press. ISBN 978-1-59114-639-1.
