= Affaire des poudres =

The affaire des poudres (French: "gunpowder scandal" or "gunpowder incident") may refer to:

- The Siege of Lille (1708)
- The Iéna Disaster
