= Henri-Louis Manceron =

French naval officer

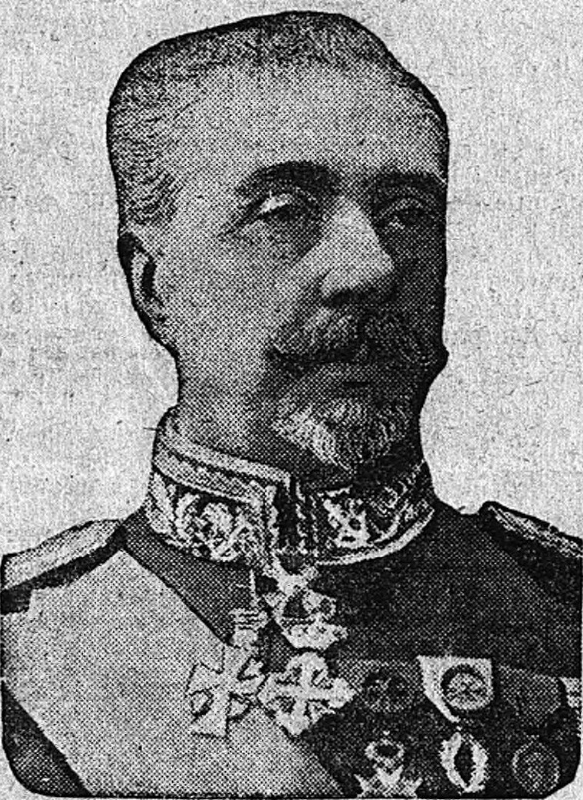
- Born: 19 June 1848; Lorient, France
- Died: 27 October 1917 (aged 69); Paris, France
- Military career
- Allegiance: France
- Branch: French Navy

Henri-Louis Manceron (29 June 1848 – 27 October 1917) was a French naval officer.

== Naval career ==
He entered the École Navale (Naval School) in October 1864 and graduated as a aspirant 2nd class in August 1866. 1st class midshipman (October 1867), he embarked on the Jean Bart (in) then on the horse transport Aveyron and was appointed ensign in October 1869. He then went on the paddle aviso Kien-Chan then on the gunboat Frelon during the war of 1870.

A student of the Châlons School of Shooting (1875), he served on the gunboat Gladiator (1875–1876) then on the paddle corvette Eumenides (1876–1877) and was promoted to lieutenant in August 1877.

From 1879 to 1881, he was on the unprotected cruiser Châteaurenault then was a student of the lang|fr|École de Canonnage in 1882–1883 and served on the Mytho from 1883 to 1886 during the Tonkin Campaign before taking command of the gunboat Hache.

Frigate captain (December 1886), second of the protected cruiser Sfax (1887-1889) then of the ironclad Hoche (1889–1891), he commanded from 1891 to 1893 the cruiser Duchaffault and was appointed captain in July 1893. He then commanded the pre-dreadnought battleship Suffren (1894-1895), the coast defense ship Jemmapes (1896–1898) and the cruiser, school-ship of application of the aspirants Iphigénie before entering in 1900 the Works Council.

Chief of staff of the Mediterranean squadron on the pre-dreadnought Saint Louis (1902), he was appointed rear admiral in June 1903 and director of the Superior School of the Navy. In 1905 he commanded a division of the Mediterranean squadron aboard the pre-dreadnought Iéna and, after the accidental explosion of the Iéna in Toulon in 1907, passed on the Saint Louis.

Vice-admiral (October 1908), acting chief of staff (1909), he retired in January 1913.

== Awards and distinctions ==
- Knight (December 28, 1882), Officer (29 December 1889), Commander (30 December 1906) then Grand Officer of the Legion of Honor (31 December 1912)

== Bibliography ==
- Taillemite, Etienne (2002) [1982]. Dictionnaire des marins français (2nd, revised and expanded ed.). Paris: Tallandier. ISBN 978-2-84734-008-2.
