= French ship Indomptable =

Five naval vessels have served in the Royal French Navy (French: Marine Royale Française), the French Navy of the Republic (French: Marine de la République), the French Imperial Navy (French: Marine Impériale Française) and French Navy (French: Marine nationale française) have been named Indomptable:

- Indomptable (1789–1805), a double-deck 80-gun ship which fought at the Glorious First of June and the Battle of Trafalgar.
- Indomptable (1810–1813), a ship captured by the 38-gun British frigate Bacchante.
- Indomptable (1877–1910), a coastal battleship.
- L'Indomptable (1933–1942), a Fantasque-class destroyer, destroyed in the scuttling of the French fleet in Toulon in 1942.
- L'Indomptable (1976–2005), a Redoutable-class submarine.

== Insignia ==
The destroyer L'Indomptable, launched in 1934, was the first to carry the insignia of the French Foreign Legion. The ship's first commander asked Général Paul-Frédéric Rollet to have the Legion as the ship's patron and guardian. The fanion of L'Indomptable was green and red, with the cannons depicted carrying the words "Magenta", "Camerone", "Tuyen Quang", and "Laffaux" (after the battles of Magenta, Camarón, Tuyên Quang and the Aisne – four engagements in which the Legion distinguished itself), and displaying the Legion's grenade as an insignia. The nuclear ballistic missile submarine Indomptable launched in 1974 continued the association.

== Gallery ==
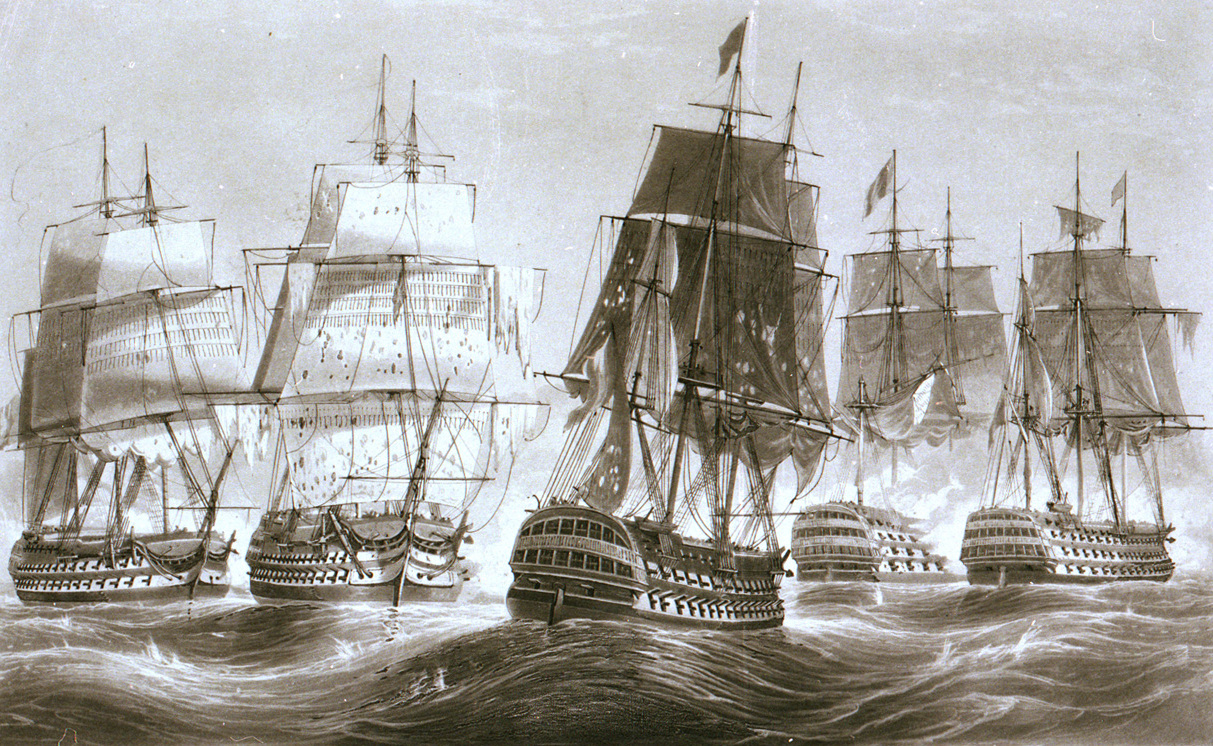
Indomptable at Trafalgar in 1805, at the center, between Fougeux & HMS Belleisle to the left, and Santa Ana & HMS Royal Sovereign.

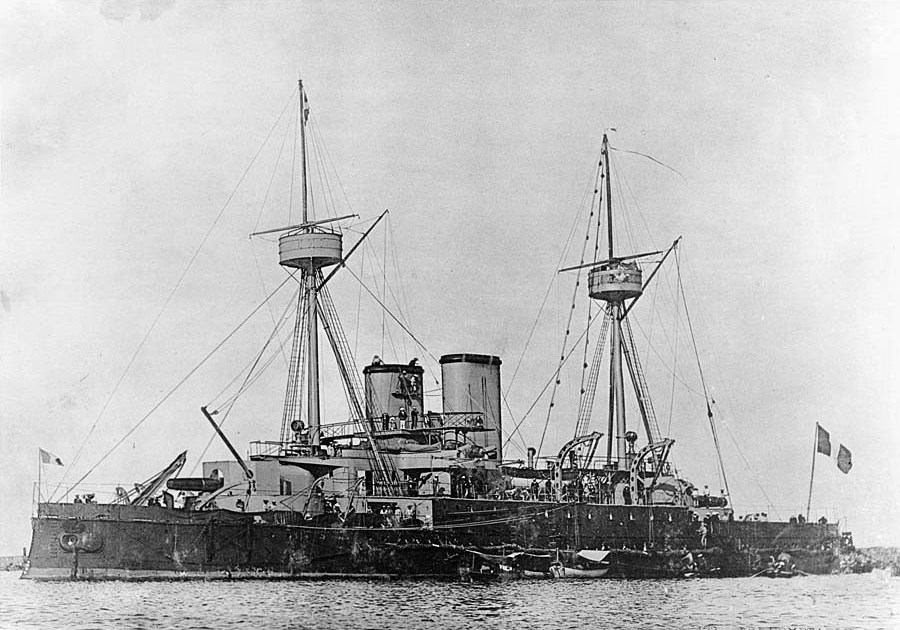
Indomptable in the late 1880s

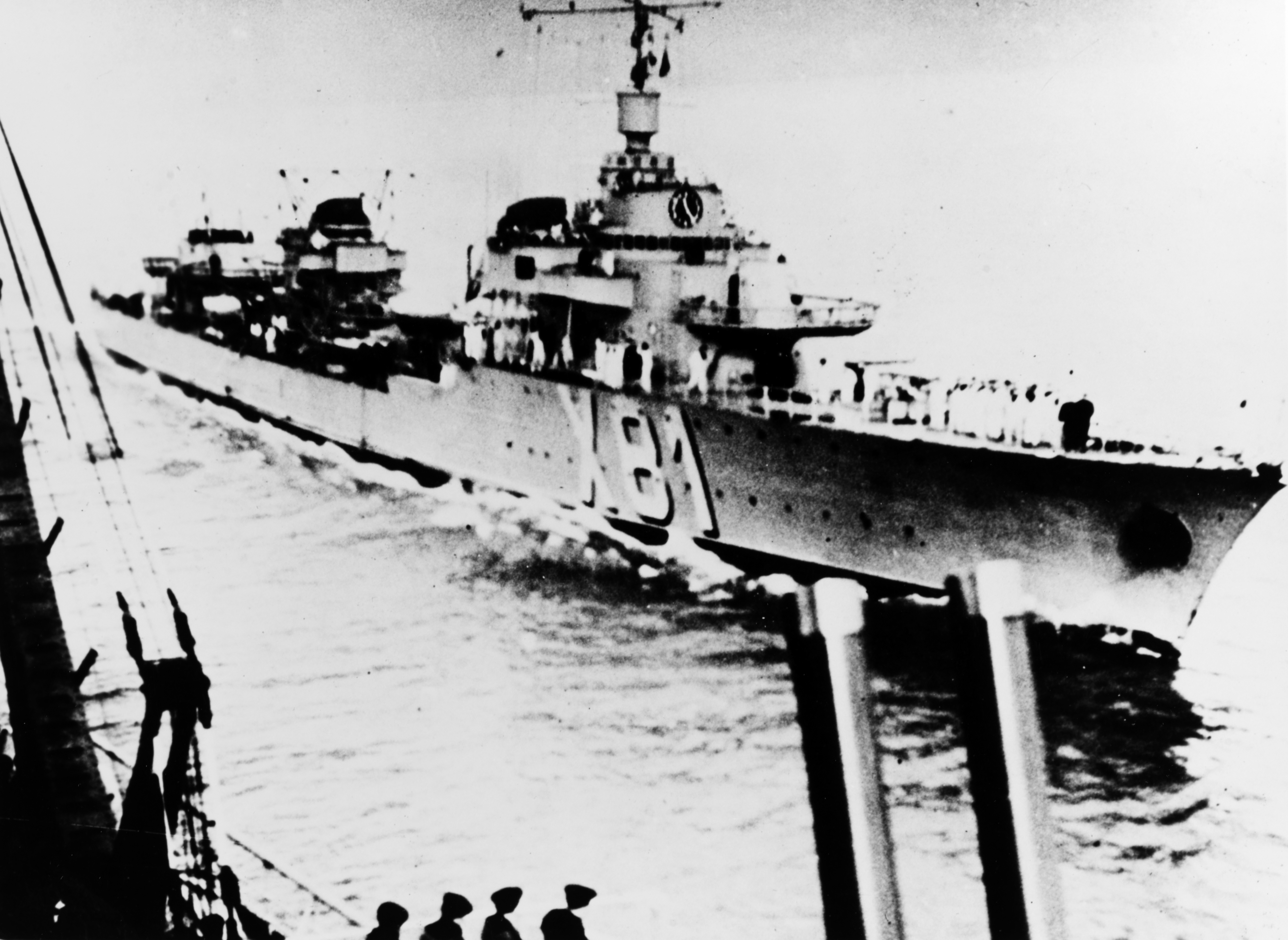
L'Indomptable in c. 1939

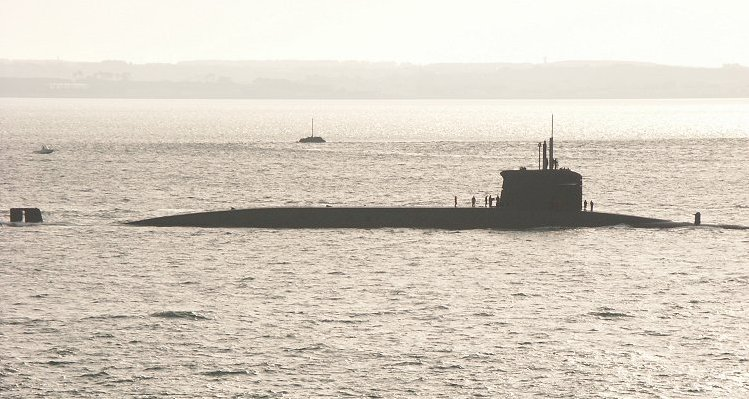
Inflexible similar to Indomptable.

== See also ==
- List of Escorteurs of the French Navy
- List of battleships of France
