= French battleship Iéna =

French Navy pre-dreadnought battleship

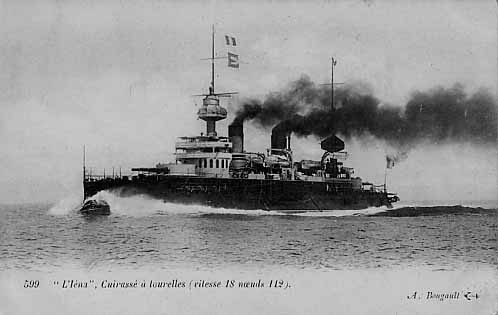
- A postcard of Iéna during her sea trials

Class overview
- Operators: French Navy
- Preceded by: Charlemagne class
- Succeeded by: Suffren
- Built: 1898–1902
- In service: 1902–1907
- Completed: 1
- Scrapped: 1

History

France
- Name: Iéna
- Namesake: Battle of Jena-Auerstedt
- Ordered: 3 April 1897
- Builder: Arsenal de Brest
- Cost: F25.58 million
- Laid down: 15 January 1898
- Launched: 1 September 1898
- Completed: 14 April 1902
- Decommissioned: 3 July 1907
- Stricken: 18 March 1907
- Fate: Wrecked by a magazine explosion, 12 March 1907; Sunk as target ship, 2 December 1909; Sold for scrap, 1912

General characteristics
- Type: Pre-dreadnought battleship
- Displacement: 11,688 t (11,503 long tons) (designed); 12,105 t (11,914 long tons) (deep load)
- Length: 122.31 m (401 ft 3 in) (o/a)
- Beam: 20.81 m (68 ft 3 in)
- Draught: 8.45 m (27 ft 9 in)
- Installed power: 20 Belleville boilers; 16,500 PS (12,100 kW)
- Propulsion: 3 shafts, 3 triple-expansion steam engines
- Speed: 18 knots (33 km/h; 21 mph)
- Range: 4,400 nmi (8,100 km; 5,100 mi) at 10.3 knots (19.1 km/h; 11.9 mph)
- Complement: 701
- Armament: 2 × twin 305 mm (12 in) guns; 8 × single 164.7 mm (6.5 in) guns; 8 × single 100 mm (3.9 in) guns; 20 × single 47 mm (1.9 in) guns; 4 × 450 mm (17.7 in) torpedo tubes
- Armour: Belt: 224–320 mm (8.8–12.6 in); Deck: 65 mm (2.6 in); Barbettes: 250 mm (9.8 in); Turrets: 290 mm (11.4 in); Conning tower: 258–298 mm (10.2–11.7 in)

Iéna French pronunciation: [je.na] was a pre-dreadnought battleship built for the French Navy (Marine nationale). Completed in 1902 and named for one of Napoleon's victories, the ship was assigned to the Mediterranean Squadron and remained there for the duration of her career, frequently serving as a flagship. She participated in the annual fleet manoeuvres and made many visits to French ports in the Mediterranean. In 1907, while Iéna was docked for a refit, there was a magazine explosion that was probably caused by the decomposition of old Poudre B propellant. It killed 120 people and badly damaged the ship. Investigations were launched afterwards, and the ensuing scandal forced the Navy Minister to resign. While the damage could have been repaired, the five-year-old ship was considered obsolete due to the arrival of new dreadnoughts, and it was deemed worth neither the time nor the expense. Her salvaged hulk was used as a gunnery target in 1909, then sold for scrap in 1912.

== Design and description ==
On 11 February 1897 Navy Minister (Ministre de la Marine) Armand Besnard, after consultations with the Supreme Naval Council (Conseil supérieur de la Marine), requested a design for an enlarged Charlemagne-class battleship with a maximum displacement of 12,000 tonnes (11,810 long tons), an armour scheme capable of preserving stability and buoyancy after several penetrations of the hull and the resulting flooding, an armament equal to those of foreign battleships, a speed of 18 knots (33 km/h; 21 mph) and a minimum range of 4,500 nautical miles (8,300 km; 5,200 mi). The Director of Naval Construction (Directeur du matérial), Jules Thibaudier, had already prepared a preliminary design two months earlier with improved Harvey armour, but it was modified to increase the height of the belt armour above the waterline and to replace the 138.6-millimetre (5.5 in) guns of the Charlemagnes with 164.7-millimetre (6.5 in) guns. Thibaudier submitted his revised design on 9 February and it was approved by the Board of Construction (Conseil des travaux) on 4 March with minor revisions.

Iéna had an overall length of 122.31 metres (401 ft 3 in), a beam of 20.81 metres (68 ft 3 in) and, at deep load, a draught of 7.45 metres (24 ft 5 in) forward and 8.45 metres (27 ft 9 in) aft. She displaced 11,688 tonnes (11,503 long tons) at normal and 12,105 tonnes (11,914 long tons) at deep load. As a flagship, Iéna had a crew of 48 officers and 731 ratings; as a private ship, her crew numbered 33 officers and 668 ratings. The ship was fitted with large bilge keels, but, according to naval historian N.J.M. Campbell, was reported to roll considerably and pitch heavily, although this is contradicted by Captain (Capitaine de vaisseau) Bouxin's report of November 1905: "From the sea-keeping point of view the Iéna is an excellent ship. Pitching and rolling movements are gentle and the ship rides the waves well." Naval historians John Jordan and Philippe Caresse believe the ship was a good gun platform because she had a long, slow roll and she manoeuvred well.

Iéna was powered by a trio of four-cylinder vertical triple-expansion steam engines, each driving a three-bladed propeller that was 4.5 metres (14 ft 9 in) in diameter on the outer shafts and 4.4 metres (14 ft 5 in) on the centre shaft. The engines were powered by 20 Belleville boilers at a working pressure of 18 kg/cm^{2} (1,765 kPa; 256 psi) and were rated at a total of 16,500 metric horsepower (12,100 kW) to give the ship a speed of 18 knots (33 km/h; 21 mph). During her sea trials on 16 July 1901, the ship barely exceeded her designed speed, reaching 18.1 knots (33.5 km/h; 20.8 mph) from 16,590 metric horsepower (12,200 kW). Iéna carried a maximum of 1,165 tonnes (1,147 long tons) of coal; this allowed her to steam for 4,400 nautical miles (8,100 km; 5,100 mi) at a speed of 10.3 knots (19.1 km/h; 11.9 mph). The ship's 80-volt electrical power was provided by four dynamos, a pair each of 600- and 1,200-ampere capacity.

=== Armament and armour ===
Like the Charlemagne-class ships, Iéna carried her main armament of four 40-calibre Canon de 305 mm (12 in) Modèle 1893–1896 guns in two twin-gun turrets, one each fore and aft of the superstructure. Each turret had a dedicated 300-ampere dynamo to traverse it and to power the ammunition hoist. The guns, however, were manually elevated between their limits of −5° and +15°, and they were normally loaded at an angle of −5°. The guns fired 340-kilogram (750 lb) armour-piercing, capped (APC) projectiles at the rate of one round per minute at a muzzle velocity of 815 m/s (2,670 ft/s). This gave a range of 12,000 metres (13,000 yd) at the maximum elevation of +15°. The magazines stored 45 shells per gun, and an additional 14 projectiles were stowed in each turret.

The ship's secondary armament consisted of eight 45-calibre Canon de 164.7 mm Modèle 1893 guns, which were mounted in the central battery on the upper deck, and fired 54.2-kilogram (119 lb) APC shells. At their maximum elevation of +15°, their muzzle velocity of 800 m/s (2,600 ft/s) gave them a maximum range of 9,000 metres (9,800 yd). Each gun was provided with 200 rounds, enough for 80 minutes at their sustained rate of fire of 2–3 rounds per minute. She also carried eight 45-calibre Canon de 100 mm (3.9 in) Modèle 1893 guns in single, unprotected, mounts on the shelter deck. These guns fired a 14-kilogram (31 lb) projectile at 740 m/s (2,400 ft/s), which could be trained up to 20° for a maximum range of 9,500 metres (10,400 yd). Their theoretical maximum rate of fire was six rounds per minute, but only three rounds per minute could be sustained. Each gun was provided with 240 shells in the ship's magazine.

Iéna's anti-torpedo boat defences consisted of twenty 40-calibre Canon de 47 mm (1.9 in) Modèle 1885 Hotchkiss guns, fitted in platforms on both military masts, embrasures in the hull, and in the superstructure. They fired a 1.49-kilogram (3.3 lb) projectile at 610 m/s (2,000 ft/s) to a maximum range of 4,000 metres (4,400 yd). Their theoretical maximum rate of fire was fifteen rounds per minute, but only seven rounds per minute sustained. The ship's magazines held 15,000 shells for these guns. Rear-Admiral (Contre-amiral) René Marquis criticised the arrangements for the 47 mm guns in a 1903 report: "The number of ready-use rounds is insufficient and the hoists are desperately slow. The 47 mm guns, much more so than the large and medium-calibre guns, will have to fight at night; yet these are the only guns without a fire-control system designed for night operations. This is a deficiency which needs to be corrected as soon as possible." Iéna also mounted four 450-millimetre (17.7 in) torpedo tubes, two on each broadside, one submerged and the other above water. The submerged tubes were fixed at a 60° angle from the centreline and the above-water mounts could traverse 80°. Twelve Modèle 1889 torpedoes were carried, of which four were training models in peacetime.

The ship had a complete waterline belt of Harvey armour that was 2.4 metres (7 ft 10 in) high. The armour plates were 320 mm (12.6 in) thick amidships; they thinned to a thickness of 272 mm (10.7 in) at the bow and 224 mm (8.8 in) at the stern. Below the waterline, the plates tapered to a thickness of 120 mm (4.7 in) at their bottom edge for most of the ship's length although the plates at the stern were 100 mm thick. The upper armour belt was in two strakes, the lower 120 mm thick and the upper 80 mm (3.1 in). Their combined height was 2 metres (6 ft 7 in) amidships. The lower strake was backed by a highly subdivided cofferdam intended to reduce flooding from any penetrating hits as its compartments were filled by 14,858 water-resistant "bricks" of dried and compressed Zostera seaweed (briquettes de zostère). The seaweed was intended to expand upon contact with water and plug any holes. The armoured deck consisted of a 65 mm (2.6 in) mild steel plate laid over two 9 mm (0.35 in) plates. The splinter deck beneath it comprised two layers of 17 mm (0.67 in) plates.

The Harvey armour plates protecting the sides of the turrets were 290 mm (11.4 in) in thickness and the mild steel of the turret roofs was 50 mm (2 in) thick. The barbettes were protected by 250 mm (9.8 in) of Harvey armour. The sides and rear of the central battery were 90 mm (3.5 in) thick. The forward transverse bulkhead ranged in thickness from 55–150 millimetres (2.2–5.9 in), the thicker plates protecting the central battery, and reduced in thickness the further down it went until it met the armoured deck. The 164 mm guns were protected by 70-millimetre (2.8 in) gun shields. The armour plates protecting the conning tower ranged in thickness from 258 to 298 mm (10.2 to 11.7 in) on its face and rear, respectively. Its communications tube was protected by 200 mm (7.9 in) of armour.

== Construction and career ==
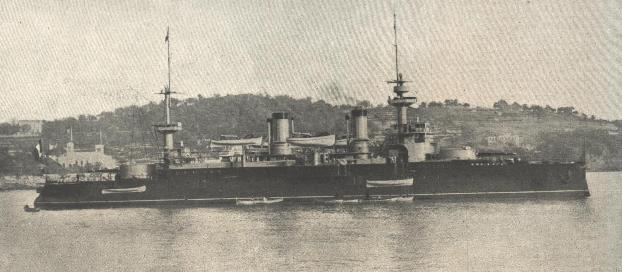
Iéna in March 1907

Ordered on 3 April 1897, and named after the French victory at the Battle of Jena, Iéna was laid down at the Arsenal de Brest on 15 January 1898. She was launched on 1 September and completed (armement définitif) on 14 April 1902 at a cost of F25.58 million. Five days later the ship departed for Toulon, losing one man overboard and having some problems with her rudder en route, before arriving on 25 April. Iéna became Marquis' flagship as commander of the Second Division of the Mediterranean Squadron on 1 May and was docked for repairs during 14–31 May. After the completion of the repairs the ship began a series of port visits in France and French North Africa which would be repeated for most of her career. She spent most of January 1903 refitting and was inspected by King Alfonso XIII of Spain during a visit to Cartagena in June. After another refit from 20 August to 10 September, Iéna, together with the rest of the Mediterranean Squadron, visited the Balearic Islands in October. During the return voyage, two crewmen died while training with the manual steering gear in heavy seas. Marquis was relieved by Rear-Admiral Léon Barnaud on 3 November. Iéna conducted training exercises off the coast of Provence from 19 November to 17 December.

Iéna participated in the fleet review off Naples in April–May 1904 when Émile Loubet, President of France, had a state visit with King Victor Emmanuel III of Italy. Afterwards, the Mediterranean Squadron cruised the Levant, visiting Beirut, Suda Bay, Smyrna, Mytilene, Salonika and Piraeus. In 1905 the ship was refitted during 15–25 April and then participated in the summer cruise of the Mediterranean Squadron, during which she visited ports in France and French North Africa between 10 May and 24 June. She took part in the annual fleet manoeuvres over the period 3 July–1 August. Rear-Admiral Henri-Louis Manceron relieved Barnaud on 16 November. During 12–17 April 1906, Iéna was dispatched to provide assistance to Naples after the eruption of Mount Vesuvius. Beginning on 3 July, the ship participated in the combined fleet manoeuvres, which included the Northern Squadron that year. After the conclusion of the exercise on 4 August, she spent most of the next several months refitting, aside from participating in an international naval review in Marseille on 16 September with British, Spanish and Italian ships. While exercising off Toulon shortly afterwards, the ship accidentally collided with and sank Torpedo Boat No. 96.

=== Loss ===
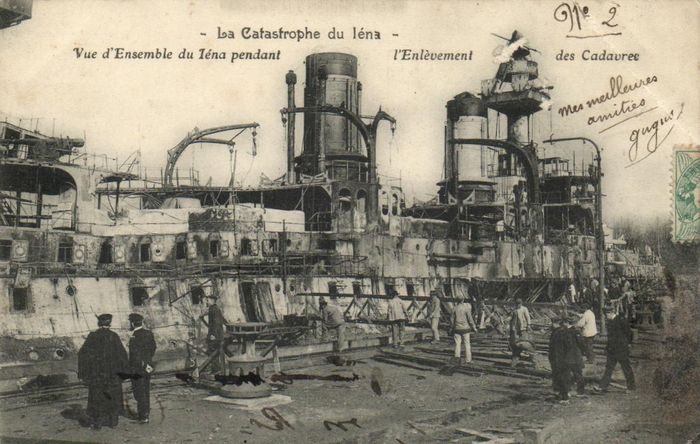
A postcard showing the amidships portion of Iéna, with charred and scorched paint prominent

On 4 March 1907 Iéna was moved into Dry dock No. 2 in the Missiessy Basin at Toulon to undergo maintenance of her hull as well as an inspection of her leaking rudder shaft. Eight days later, beginning at 13:35 and continuing until 14:45, a series of explosions began near the aft 100-millimetre magazines which devastated the ship and the surrounding area. The explosions blew the roofs off three nearby workshops and gutted the area between the aft funnel and the aft turret. Because the ship was in a dry dock with the water pumped out, it was initially impossible to flood the magazines, which had not been unloaded before docking. The commanding officer of the battleship Patrie, which was moored nearby, fired a shell into the dry dock gates in an attempt to flood it, but the shell ricocheted without holing the gate. They were manually opened shortly afterwards by one of the ship's officers. A total of 118 crewmen and dockyard workers were killed by the explosions, as were 2 civilians in the suburb of Pont-Las who were killed by fragments.

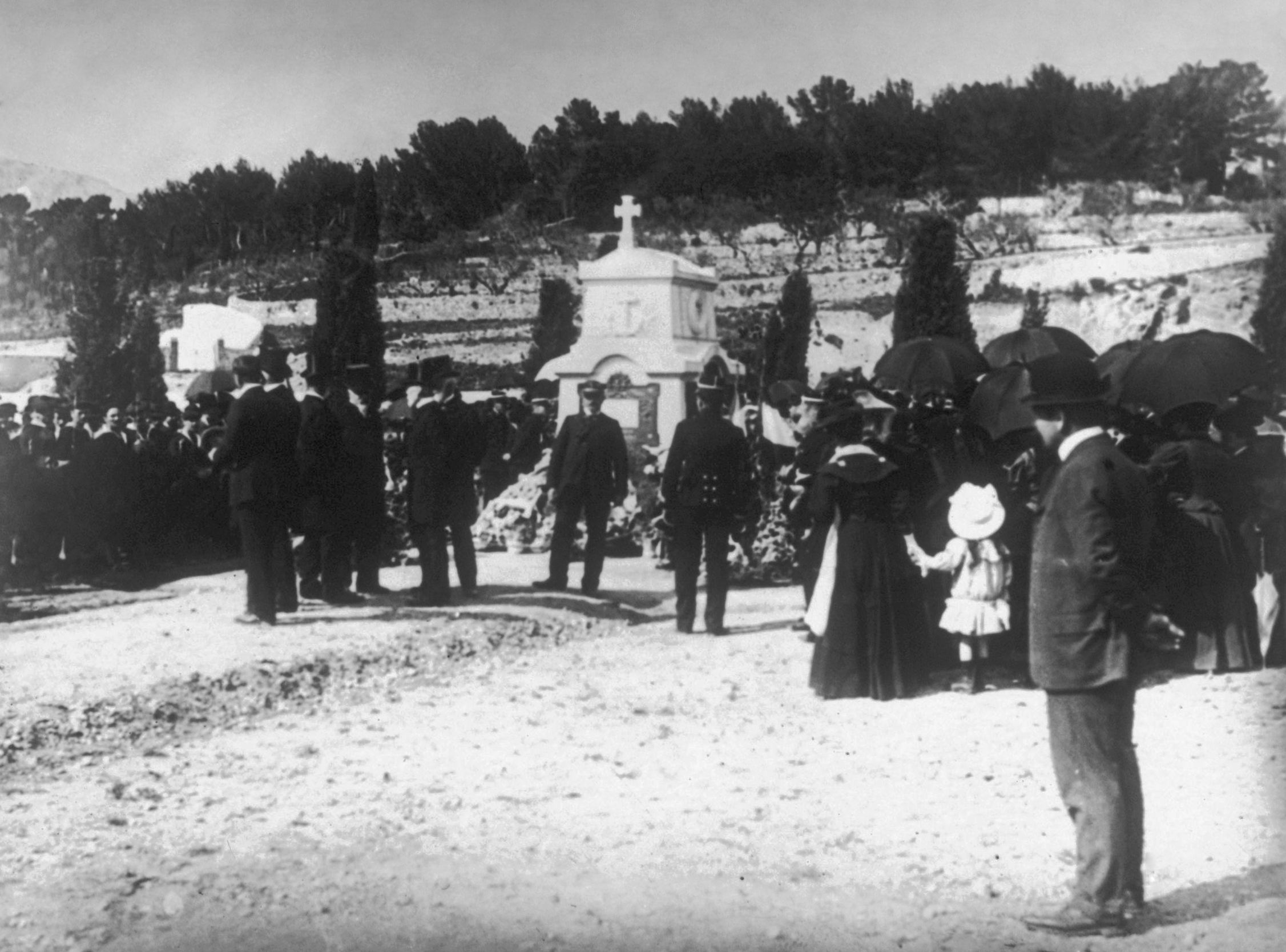
Inauguration of the monument to the victims of the explosion, 1908

On 17 March, the President of France, Armand Fallières, and Georges Clemenceau, who was both the President of the Council of Ministers and Minister of the Interior attended the funeral of those lost during the explosion. A national day of mourning was declared and a monument was built in the cemetery of Lagoubran. Both houses of the French Parliament, the Senate and the Chamber of Deputies, organised commissions to inquire into the cause of the explosion. The Senate appointed its commission on 20 March under the chairmanship of Ernest Monis; the Chamber of Deputies followed eight days later with Henri Michel as chair.

The origin of the first explosion was traced to a 100 mm magazine and was believed to have been caused by decomposing Poudre B, a nitrocellulose-based propellant, which tended to become unstable with age and self-ignite, though a report published in April 1907 stated a torpedo exploded in the torpedo room directly below the magazine. When burnt, it gave off yellow-coloured smoke, which matched the colour seen by eye-witnesses. To test this theory, Gaston Thomson, the Navy Minister, ordered on 31 March that a replica magazine and the adjacent black-powder magazine be built, but when the tests were conducted on 6–7 August, they were deemed inconclusive because the propellant used in the test was not of the same age as that aboard Iéna. Fallières appointed a technical commission on 6 August that included mathematician Henri Poincaré, chemist Albin Haller and the inventor of Poudre B, Paul Vieille, that failed to come to a definite conclusion. The navy's Propellant Branch (Service des Poudres et Saltpêtres) objected to the criticisms of its product, claiming that it was tested to resist 43 °C (110 °F) temperatures for 12 hours, although it never explained how that test was relevant to the long-term storage of Poudre B in magazines limited to natural ventilation, as was used by every ship in the fleet. The Monis Commission published its report on 9 July, blaming the explosion on Poudre B, and was debated on 21–26 November. The Michel Commission published its report on 7 November 1908, although its contents had been debated on 16–19 October, and was "a model of vagueness and imprecision". The reason for the explosion became a cause célèbre with accusations of gross negligence by the government such that Thomson was forced to resign on the last day of the debate.

=== Disposal ===
The multiple explosions ripped open the ship's side between Frames 74 and 84 down to the lower edge of the armour belt, and all the machinery in this area was destroyed. After it was estimated that it would take seven million francs and two years to fully repair Iéna, which was already obsolete, the navy decided to decommission her and use her as a target ship. The ship was stricken from the navy list on 18 March and her crew was reassigned on 3 July. Iéna was disarmed, except for her 305 mm guns, and all useful equipment was removed in 1908. She was rendered seaworthy again at a cost of 700,000 francs and was towed to a mooring off the Île des Porquerolles. A programme to evaluate the effectiveness of Melinite-filled armour-piercing shells began on 9 August 1909 with the armoured cruiser Condé firing projectiles from her 164.7 mm and 194 mm (7.6 in) guns at a range of 6,000 metres (6,600 yd). After every shot the results were photographed and the effects on the crew of wooden dummies and live animals evaluated. By 2 December Iéna was close to foundering and the navy decided to have her towed to deeper water. Shortly after the tow began, she capsized and sank in shallow water. The rights to the wreck were sold on 21 December 1912 for 33,005 francs and she was slowly broken up and salvaged between 1912 and 1927. Another company was contracted to remove the remnants of the wreck in 1957.
