= French battleship Suffren =

Predreadnought ship sunk in 1916

Coordinates: 39.3°N 11.0°W

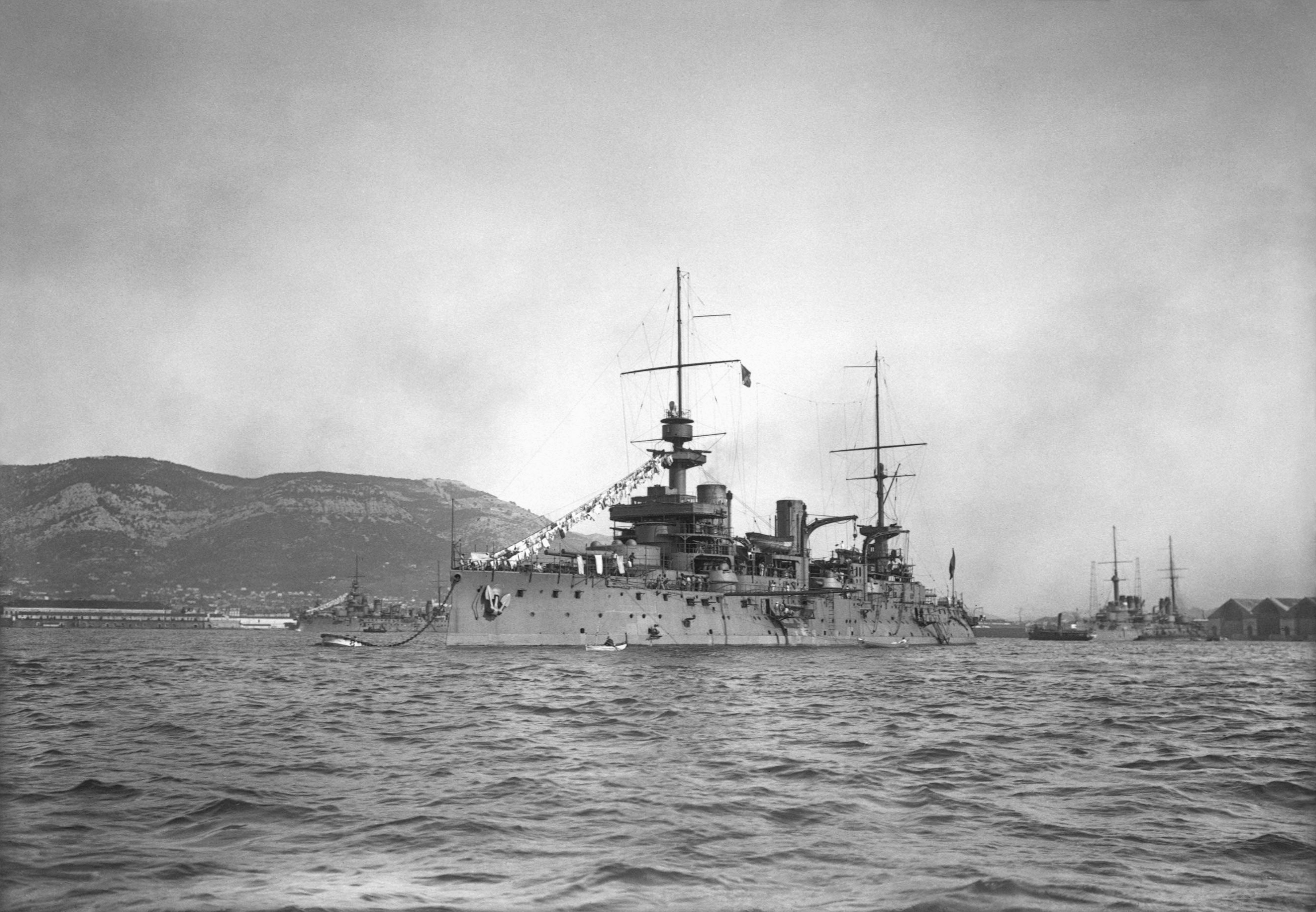
- Suffren off Toulon on 23 October 1911

Class overview
- Operators: French Navy
- Preceded by: Iéna
- Succeeded by: République-class battleship
- Built: 1898–1904
- In service: 1904–1916
- Completed: 1
- Lost: 1

History

France
- Name: Suffren
- Namesake: Pierre André de Suffren de Saint Tropez
- Ordered: 21 April 1898
- Builder: Arsenal de Brest
- Laid down: 5 January 1899
- Launched: 25 July 1899
- Commissioned: 3 February 1904
- Fate: Torpedoed and sunk, 26 November 1916

General characteristics
- Type: Pre-dreadnought battleship
- Displacement: 12,432 t (12,236 long tons) (normal); 12,892 t (12,688 long tons) (full load)
- Length: 125.91 m (413 ft 1 in)
- Beam: 21.42 m (70 ft 3 in)
- Draught: 8.22 m (27 ft)
- Installed power: 24 Niclausse boilers; 16,200 ihp (12,100 kW)
- Propulsion: 3 shafts, 3 triple-expansion steam engines
- Speed: 17 kn (31 km/h; 20 mph)
- Range: 3,086 nmi (5,715 km; 3,551 mi) at 12 kn (22 km/h; 14 mph)
- Complement: 668 (normal), 742 (flagship)
- Armament: 2 × twin 305 mm (12 in) guns; 10 × single 164.7 mm (6.5 in) guns; 8 × single 100 mm (3.9 in) guns; 22 × single 47 mm (1.9 in) guns; 2 × single 37 mm (1.5 in) guns; 4 × 450 mm (17.7 in) torpedo tubes
- Armour: Belt: 300 mm (11.8 in); Decks: 60 mm (2.4 in); Barbettes: 250 mm (9.8 in); Main turrets: 290 mm (11.4 in); Bulkheads: 110 mm (4.3 in); Conning tower: 224–274 mm (8.8–10.8 in)

Suffren was a predreadnought battleship built for the Marine Nationale (French Navy) in the first decade of the twentieth century. Completed in 1902, the ship was assigned to the Escadre de la Méditerranée (Mediterranean Squadron) for most of her career and often served as a flagship. She had an eventful career as she twice collided with French ships and twice had propeller shafts break before the start of World War I in 1914. Suffren was assigned to join the naval operations off the Dardanelles, where she participated in a series of attacks on the Ottoman fortifications guarding the straits.

She was moderately damaged during the fighting on 18 March 1915 and had to be sent to Toulon for repairs. Upon their completion the ship returned to provide gunfire support for the Allied forces during the Gallipoli Campaign. Suffren provided covering fire as the Allies withdrew from the peninsula and accidentally sank one of the evacuation ships. After repairs the ship was assigned to the French squadron tasked to prevent any interference by the Greeks with Allied operations on the Salonica front. While en route to Lorient for a refit, Suffren was torpedoed off Lisbon by an Imperial German submarine on 26 November 1916 and sank with all hands.

== Design and description ==
The three battleships of the Charlemagne class that had been authorized in 1893 were still building when the Navy Minister, Vice-amiral (Vice Admiral) Armand Besnard, was able to get the Chamber of Deputies to authorize the battleship Iéna in 1897 to an improved Charlemagne design. The Chamber authorized another battleship the following year and Besnard, not wishing to delay construction for the time required for an entirely new design, requested an enlarged and improved version of Iéna.

Suffren was intended to have only modest improvements in armament and armour, but the number of improvements grew as the project was discussed by the Conseil des travaux de la Marine (Board of Construction) so that she was essentially a new design, retaining only some of Iéna's layout. The biggest changes were that the bulk of the secondary armament was mounted in turrets, rather than Iéna's casemates, and the stowage of shells for the main armament was increased from 45 to 60 rounds per gun.

=== General characteristics ===
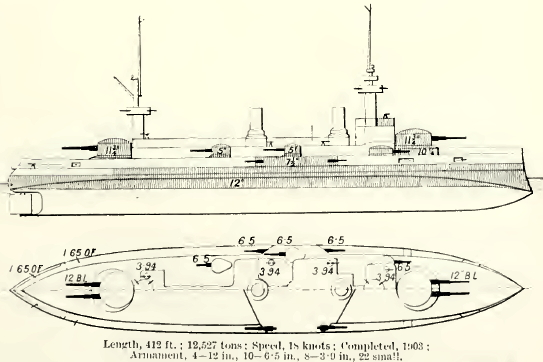
Plan and right elevation from Brassey's Naval Annual 1912

Suffren was 3.55 m (11 ft 8 in) longer than Iéna, being 125.91 m (413 ft 1 in) long overall. She had a beam of 21.42 m (70 ft 3 in) and a draught of 7.39 m (24 ft 3 in) forward and 8.22 m (27 ft) aft. She displaced 12,432 t (12,236 long tons) at normal displacement, and 12,892 t (12,688 long tons) at full load, over 700 t (690 long tons) more than the earlier ship. Suffren was fitted with bilge keels to reduce her rolling. Her crew numbered 31 officers and 637 men as a private ship and 42 officers and 700 sailors as a flagship.

=== Propulsion ===
Suffren was powered by three Indret vertical triple-expansion steam engines, each driving one propeller shaft. The centre shaft drove a three-bladed screw propeller and the wing propellers were four-bladed; each was 4.39 m (14 ft 5 in) in diameter. The engines used steam provided by 24 Niclausse boilers at a working pressure of 18 kg/cm^{2} (1,765 kPa; 256 psi). Rated at a total of 16,200 ihp (12,100 kW), the engines were intended to give the ship a speed of 17 kn (31 km/h; 20 mph). During her sea trials on 12 November 1903, they produced 16,809 ihp (12,534 kW) and gave a top speed of 17.9 kn (33.2 km/h; 20.6 mph). The ship carried a maximum of 1,233 t (1,214 long tons) of coal which allowed her to steam for 3,086 nmi (5,715 km; 3,551 mi) at a speed of 12 kn (22 km/h; 14 mph). Suffren carried 52.15 t (51.33 long tons) of fuel oil to be sprayed on the coal to improve its burn rate. The ship's 80-volt electrical power was provided by two 600-ampere and three 1,200-ampere dynamos.

=== Armament ===
Like Iéna, Suffren carried her main armament of four 40-calibre Canon de 305 mm (12 in) Modèle 1893/96 guns in two twin-gun turrets, one each fore and aft of the superstructure. The turrets were traversed by electric motors, but were elevated and depressed by hand. The guns were loaded at an angle of −5° and they had a maximum elevation of +15°. They fired 349.4 kg (770 lb) armour-piercing projectiles at the rate of roughly one round per minute. They had a muzzle velocity of 855 m/s (2,810 ft/s) which gave a range of 12,000 m (13,000 yd) at maximum elevation. Suffren carried 60 shells for each gun with each turret holding ready-use racks for 22 projectiles.

The ship's secondary armament consisted of ten 45-calibre Canon de 164.7 mm (6.5 in) Modèle 1893/96 guns. Six of these were mounted in single-gun turrets on each side of the superstructure and the remaining four guns were positioned below them on the upper deck in individual casemates that were sponsoned out over the tumblehome of the sides. The guns fired 54.9 kg (121 lb) shells at a muzzle velocity of 900 m/s (3,000 ft/s) to a maximum range of 10,800 m (11,800 yd). Their theoretical rate of fire was between two and three rounds per minute. Suffren carried 200 shells for each gun. She also carried eight 45-calibre Canon de 100 mm (3.9 in) Modèle 1893 guns in shielded mounts on the shelter deck and on the superstructure. These guns fired a 16 kg (35 lb) projectile at 710 m/s (2,300 ft/s), which could be elevated up to +20° for a maximum range of 9,000 m (9,800 yd). Their maximum rate of fire was four rounds per minute. The ship carried 2,000 shells for these guns.

For defence against torpedo boats, Suffren mounted twenty-two 50-calibre Canon de 47 mm (1.9 in) Modèle 1885 Hotchkiss guns. They were positioned in the fighting tops and on the superstructure. They fired a 1.5 kg (3.3 lb) projectile at 650 m/s (2,100 ft/s) to a maximum range of 5,000 m (5,500 yd). Their theoretical maximum rate of fire was fifteen rounds per minute, but only seven rounds per minute sustained. Suffren carried 16,500 rounds for these guns. Two 37 mm (1.5 in) Modèle 1885 Hotchkiss guns were also mounted on the upper bridge.

The ship was equipped with four 450 mm (17.7 in) torpedo tubes on the broadside. Two of these were submerged, abaft the forward turret, and fixed at a 30° angle to the side. The two above-water tubes could traverse 80°. Normally Suffren carried twelve Modèle 1892 torpedoes, of which four were training models.

=== Armour ===
Suffren had a complete waterline armour belt of Harvey armour that had a maximum thickness of 300 mm (11.8 in) amidships and reduced to 250 mm (9.8 in) at the bow and 230 mm (9.1 in) at the stern. The lower edge of this belt was 124 mm (4.9 in) in thickness amidships and thinned to 113 mm (4.4 in) at the bow and 100 mm (3.9 in) at the stern. The armour plates were 2.5 m (8 ft 2 in) high of which 1.4 m (4 ft 7 in) was above the waterline and 1.1 m (3 ft 7 in) below it. Above this was a strake of special-steel armour that extended from the bow to the aft transverse bulkhead below the aft main-gun turret. In thickness it ranged from 70 mm (2.8 in) at the bow to 110 mm (4.3 in) amidships. This armour was backed by a highly subdivided cofferdam intended to reduce flooding from any penetrating hits as its compartments were filled by water-resistant "bricks" of dried Zostera seaweed (briquettes de zostère). The outer sides of the casemates were protected by special-steel plates 110 millimetres thick. The casemates were separated by an 80 mm (3.1 in) transverse bulkhead and a centreline bulkhead 50 mm (2 in) thick subdivided the casemates.

The main turret armour was 290 mm (11.4 in) in thickness with a 50-millimetre roof and the barbettes were protected by 250 mm (9.8 in) of armour. The armour for the secondary turrets ranged from 102 mm (4 in) thick at the front to 192 mm (7.6 in) at the rear. The conning tower had walls 224–274 mm (8.8–10.8 in) thick and its communications tube was protected by 150 mm (5.9 in) of armour. The armoured deck consisted of 55–60 mm (2.2–2.4 in) mild-steel plates laid over two 10 mm (0.39 in) plates. The splinter deck beneath it comprised two layers of 19 mm (0.75 in) plates.

== Construction and career ==
=== Prewar ===
Suffren, named after Vice-amiral Pierre André de Suffren de Saint-Tropez, was ordered on 21 April 1898 from the Arsenal de Brest. She was laid down on 5 January 1899 and launched on 25 July of the same year. Her fitting-out was delayed by the late delivery of fittings and armour. Suffren began her sea trials in November 1903, but was not commissioned until 3 February 1904. On 18 August 1903 she participated in a gunnery trial with the predreadnought Masséna off Île Longue. A mild-steel plate 55 cm (21.7 in) thick, measuring 225 by 95 cm (7 ft 5 in by 3 ft 1 in), was attached to the side of Suffren's forward turret to determine the resistance of an armour plate to a large-calibre shell with six sheep placed in the turret to simulate its crew. Masséna anchored 100 m (330 ft) away from Suffren and fired a number of 305-millimetre shells at the plate. The first three were training shells that knocked splinters off the armour plate. The last two shells, fired with full charges, cracked the plate, but Suffren's turret was fully operational, as was her Germain electrical fire-control system, and the sheep were unharmed. One splinter struck Masséna above her armour belt and left a 15-centimetre sized hole in her hull. Another 50 kg (110 lb) splinter landed within a few metres of the Naval Minister, Camille Pelletan, who was observing the trials.

When Suffren was commissioned in Brest, she was assigned to the Escadre de la Méditerranée shortly afterwards. After arriving in Toulon, she became the flagship of its commander, Vice-amiral Palma Gourdon, on 24 February. Two months later she carried the President of France, Émile Loubet, on a state visit to Naples. As time went by several defects were revealed in service, including the weakness of the underpowered capstan which was barely capable of raising the anchor in waters 15–20 m (49–66 ft) deep. Another problem was that the centre engine and its propeller shaft tended to overheat. Gourdon was relieved by Vice-amiral Charles Touchard on 4 October 1905. During fleet exercises off the Îles des Hyères on 5 February 1906, Suffren accidentally rammed the submarine Bonite when the latter miscalculated the fleet's movements while manoeuvring into firing position. Bonite rose to periscope depth less than 30 m (98 ft) in front of Suffren, but the latter managed to turn quickly enough while the submarine was crash-diving that Suffren only struck Bonite a glancing blow. This was enough, however, to breach two compartments abreast the ship's starboard engine room and she had to be docked for emergency repairs. Bonite's bow was crushed and several of her ballast tanks were ripped open. Only by rapidly dropping her weighted keel was the submarine able to avoid sinking. No casualties were suffered by either vessel. During the summer of 1906 Suffren's above-water torpedo tubes were removed. She then participated in an international fleet review in Marseille on 16 September.

She was drydocked adjacent to Iéna on 12 March 1907 at Toulon when the latter ship's magazine exploded. Burning fragments started a small fire aboard Suffren, but she was not otherwise damaged by the explosion and participated in the annual fleet manoeuvres that began on 1 July. By 5 November, the ship had been replaced as flagship by the semi-dreadnought Patrie, although she remained assigned to the 1^{re} Division cuirassée (1st Battle Division). In early 1908 a 2 m (6 ft 7 in) rangefinder from Barr and Stroud was mounted on the navigation bridge. Suffren was transferred to the 3^{e} Division cuirassée in July. During manoeuvres off Golfe-Juan on 13 August, the ship's port propeller shaft broke and the propeller fell off in water 26 m (85 ft) deep. While a new shaft was ordered from Indret, Iéna's salvaged corresponding shaft was used with such success that the ship's engineers requested to keep it in place and save the new shaft as a spare. This proposal was rejected by the Naval Ministry and the shafts were exchanged. The opportunity was also taken to rework the centre propeller shaft's mounting so that it would overheat less often. In 1909 the battleships of the Escadre de la Méditerranée were reorganised into two Escadre de ligne (battle squadrons), each with a pair of three-ship divisions; the 3^{e} Division cuirassée now assigned to the 2^{e} Escadre de ligne. Suffren, as the most modern of the predreadnoughts, was often attached to the 1^{re} Escadre de ligne to replace ships that were refitting or under repair. In November 1910 the starboard propeller shaft broke and the propeller was lost in deep water. No shaft was immediately available so Suffren had to wait three months for repairs; her boilers were overhauled while a new one was manufactured. On 14 February 1911 the port anchor chain broke while Suffren was conducting towing exercises with two other battleships, killing one sailor and injuring two others. The ship participated in a naval review near Toulon on 4 September. The Escadre de la Méditerranée was renamed the 1^{er} Armée Navale (1st Naval Army) on 31 October as the Marine Nationale concentrated its forces in the Mediterranean.

When the magazines of the semi-dreadnought Liberté exploded in Toulon on 25 September 1911, flying debris from the explosion killed four men aboard Suffren. The ship was reassigned to the 2^{e} Division cuirassée of the 2^{e} Escadre de ligne as a replacement for the destroyed battleship. She was transferred to the 1^{re} Division cuirassée of the 3^{e} Escadre de ligne on 14 March 1913 and became the flagship of Vice-amiral Laurent Marin-Darbel, commander of the Escadre de ligne, four days later. The annual manoeuvres of the 1^{er} Armée Navale began on 19 May; when they were concluded the ships were reviewed by President Raymond Poincaré. The 3^{e} Escadre de ligne was dissolved on 11 November and Suffren became the flagship of Contre-amiral (Rear Admiral) Gabriel Darrieus, commander of the Division de complément (Complementary Division), four days later and he was relieved in his turn by Contre-amiral Émile Guépratte on 1 April 1914. During a fleet exercise on 28 May, Suffren accidentally rammed the battleship Démocratie; the latter ship was undamaged, but Suffren had her port anchor and hawsepipe carried away and a 1.5 by 1 m (4 ft 11 in by 3 ft 3 in) hole punched in her hull that forced her to return to port for emergency repairs.

=== World War I ===
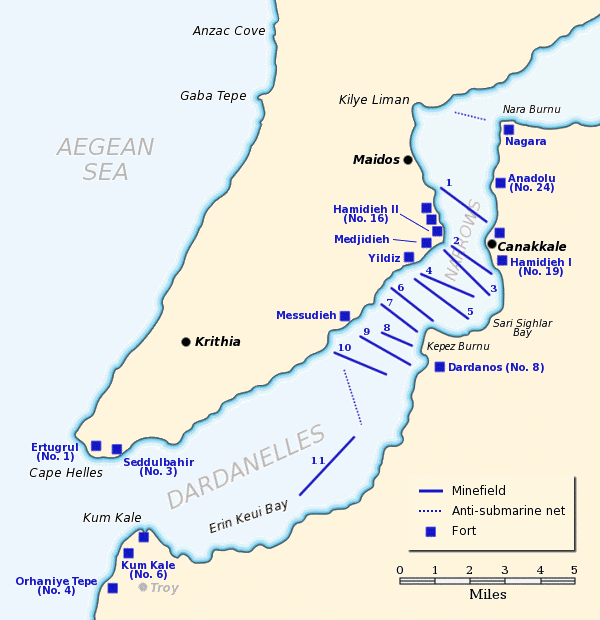
Ottoman defences of the Dardanelles, February–March 1915

When the Marine Nationale mobilized in anticipation of war on 1 August, the Division de complément was ordered to Algiers, French Algeria, to protect the convoy route to Metropolitan France. They conducted their first escort mission on 6 August before arriving at Bizerte, French Tunisia, on the 22nd where they began conducting contraband patrols in the Sicilian Narrows. In September Suffren was fitted with additional Barr and Stroud rangefinders near the bridge. Two of these were mounted on transverse rails fore and aft of the bridge. The after bulkhead was removed and the two 100-millimetre guns on the side of the superstructure were moved one deck lower. Guépratte complained that his ships were not well suited to such a mission and he was ordered to take Suffren, the predreadnought Saint Louis and the torpedo cruiser Cassini to Port Said, Egypt, to escort troop convoys from British India on 23 September. The following day he was ordered to rendezvous with the semi-dreadnought Vérité at the island of Tenedos where he was to place himself under the orders of the British Vice-Admiral Sackville Carden to assist British ships in blockading the Dardanelles to prevent any sortie by the Ottoman battlecruiser Yavuz Sultan Selim and the light cruiser Midilli back into the Mediterranean. The Division de complément was renamed the Division des Dardanelles (Dardanelles Division) to reflect its new role. On 3 November the two French battleships joined British ships bombarding the Ottoman fortifications at the mouth of the Dardanelles. The short bombardment by the Allies, during which Suffren fired 30 shells from her main guns, did little damage, but alerted the Ottomans that their defences there required strengthening. After the predreadnought Gaulois arrived on 16 November Suffren sailed for Toulon for a lengthy refit.

==== Dardanelles Campaign ====
Illustration of Suffren off the Dardanelles in 1915 by Norman Wilkinson

Suffren returned to the Dardanelles on 9 January 1915 and resumed her role as the flagship of the squadron. She bombarded the Ottoman fort of Kum Kale, on the Asiatic side of the strait on 19 February. Bouvet assisted Suffren by sending firing corrections via radio while Gaulois provided counter-battery fire to suppress the Ottoman coastal artillery. Late in the day the British predreadnought HMS Vengeance was bombarding the fort at Orhaniye Tepe on the Asiatic side of the strait and began taking heavy fire as she approached the fort. The battlecruiser HMS Inflexible attempted to suppress the coastal artillery to allow Vengeance to extricate herself, but was unsuccessful. Suffren and Gaulois had to combine their fire with that of Inflexible before Vengeance could successfully withdraw. Suffren fired thirty 305-millimetre shells and 227 shells from her secondary guns during the day.

Suffren also participated in a more limited way in the bombardment of 25 February against the same targets, but this was far more successful as Suffren and the other ships moved as close as 3,000 yd (2,700 m) from the forts. On 2 March the French squadron bombarded targets in the Gulf of Saros at the base of the Gallipoli Peninsula. On 7 March the French squadron attempted to suppress the Ottoman guns in the Dardanelles while British battleships bombarded the fortifications. Guépratte and his squadron returned to the Gulf of Saros on 11 March where they again bombarded Ottoman fortifications.

Illustration of Suffren shelling Ottoman positions

They returned to assist in the major attack on the fortifications planned for 18 March. British ships made the initial entry into the Dardanelles, but the French ships passed through them to engage the forts at closer range. Shortly after having done so Suffren was under heavy fire and was struck no less than 14 times in 15 minutes. Most did no significant damage, including a 24 cm (9.4 in) shell that bounced off the after 305-millimetre turret, but one 24-centimetre shell ricocheted off the port midships 164-millimetre turret and ripped the roof off the port casemate, killing the entire gun crew. Some flaming debris dropped into that gun's magazine and started a fire, but it was quickly flooded to prevent an explosion. Another shell punctured a hole 80 mm (3.1 in) across in the bow which flooded the base of the forward turret. While the French squadron was withdrawing pursuant to Admiral John de Robeck's order Bouvet struck a naval mine and sank in 55 seconds. Suffren lowered her admiral's barge, her only intact boat, and rescued 75 men before she had to escort the badly damaged Gaulois away from the Dardanelles. The latter was taking on water by the bow and had to be beached on one of the Rabbit Islands at the entrance of the Dardanelles before she sank.

Suffren was ordered to escort Gaulois to Toulon via Malta on 25 March. Two days later the ships encountered a storm and were forced to seek refuge in the Bay of Navarin. Suffren arrived at Toulon on 3 April and was repaired by 20 May when she returned to the Dardanelles to provide gunfire support for the troops ashore. She remained in the area until 31 December; upon returning to her anchorage at Kefalos on the island of Kos, she collided with and sank the British steamer Saint Oswald, a horse transport involved in the evacuation from Gallipoli, and was badly damaged. Suffren arrived in Toulon on 20 January 1916 for repairs which were completed by April. That month she joined the French squadron of six predreadnoughts assigned to prevent any interference by the Greeks with Allied operations on the Salonica front. On 9 July Suffren briefly became flagship of the reestablished 3^{e} Escadre de ligne when Patrie departed for a refit at Toulon. With the creation of a rival pro-Entente government in Greece in August, the Entente became concerned that the royal government might interfere with its use of Greek ports in October as King Constantine I endeavored to maintain Greek neutrality. On 7 October Patrie, Démocratie, and Suffren entered the harbour of Eleusina prepared to fire on the Greek predreadnoughts Kilkis and Limnos and the cruiser Elli, but things were resolved peacefully and the French ships returned to their base.

Suffren was originally intended to refit at the naval base at Bizerte, but the location was switched when the dockyard at Lorient informed the Naval Staff that it had room for her. On 15 November the ship departed to recoal at Bizerte which she reached on 18 November. She sailed on 20 November for Gibraltar; heavy weather en route delayed her arrival until 23 November. Suffren recoaled and departed Gibraltar the following day without an escort. On the morning of 26 November, roughly 50 nmi (93 km; 58 mi) off the Portuguese coast near Lisbon, she was torpedoed by the German submarine SM U-52, which was en route to the Austro-Hungarian naval base at Cattaro in the Adriatic Sea. The torpedo detonated a magazine and Suffren sank within seconds, taking her entire crew of 648 with her. U-52 searched the scene, but found no survivors.
