= French battleship Vérité =

French Liberté-class battleship

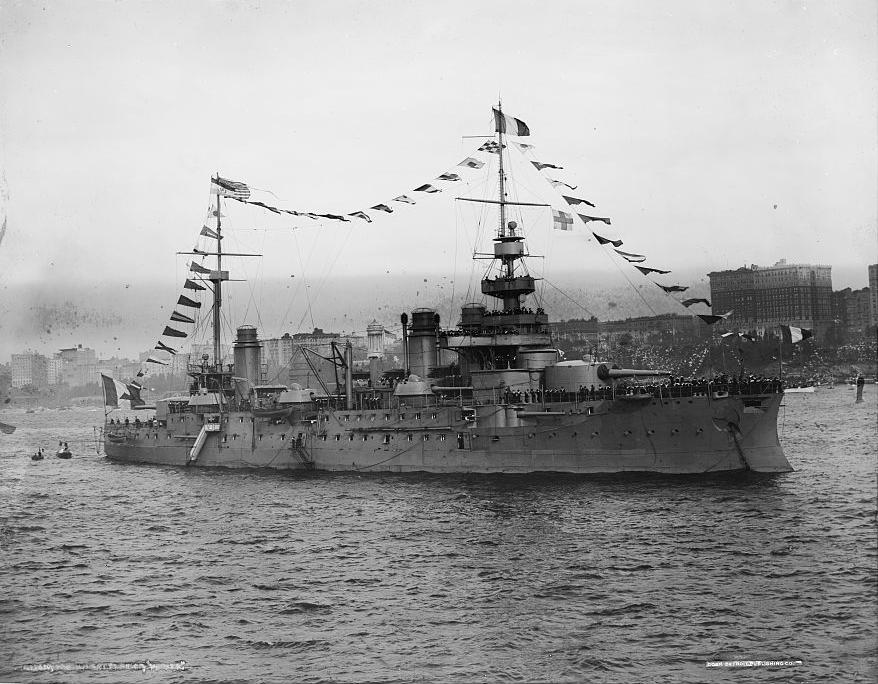
- Vérité in the United States in 1909

History

France
- Name: Vérité
- Namesake: Truth
- Laid down: April 1903
- Launched: 28 May 1907
- Commissioned: June 1908
- Stricken: 1921
- Fate: Broken up for scrap

General characteristics
- Class & type: Liberté-class battleship
- Displacement: Full load: 14,900 t (14,700 long tons)
- Length: 135.25 m (443 ft 9 in) loa
- Beam: 24.25 m (79 ft 7 in)
- Draft: 8.2 m (26 ft 11 in)
- Installed power: 22 × Belleville boilers; 17,500 CV (17,300 ihp)
- Propulsion: 3 × screw propellers; 3 × triple-expansion steam engines
- Speed: 18 knots (33 km/h; 21 mph)
- Range: 8,400 nautical miles (15,600 km; 9,700 mi) at 10 kn (19 km/h; 12 mph)
- Complement: 32 officers; 710 enlisted men
- Armament: 4 × 305 mm (12 in) guns; 10 × 194 mm (7.6 in) guns; 13 × 65 mm (2.6 in) guns; 10 × 47 mm (1.9 in) guns; 2 × 450 mm (17.7 in) torpedo tubes
- Armor: Belt: 180 to 280 mm (7.1 to 11.0 in); Turrets: 360 mm (14 in); Conning tower: 266 mm (10.5 in); Upper deck: 54 mm (2.1 in); Lower deck: 51 mm (2 in)

Vérité was a pre-dreadnought battleship built for the French Navy in the mid-1900s. She was the second member of the Liberté class, which included three other vessels and was a derivative of the preceding République class, with the primary difference being the inclusion of a heavier secondary battery. Vérité carried a main battery of four 305 mm (12 in) guns, like the République, but mounted ten 194 mm (7.6 in) guns for her secondary armament in place of the 164 mm (6.5 in) guns of the earlier vessels. Like many late pre-dreadnought designs, Vérité was completed after the revolutionary British battleship HMS Dreadnought had entered service and rendered her obsolescent.

Even before being commissioned into service with the fleet, Vérité carried President Armand Fallières on a tour of the Baltic Sea in 1908. After formally entering service, Vérité was assigned to the 2nd Division of the Mediterranean Squadron, based in Toulon. She then embarked on the normal peacetime training routine of squadron and fleet maneuvers and cruises to various ports in the Mediterranean. She also participated in several naval reviews for a number of French and foreign dignitaries. In September 1909, the ships of the 2nd Division crossed the Atlantic to the United States to represent France at the Hudson–Fulton Celebration.

Following the outbreak of World War I in July 1914, Justice was used to escort troopship convoys carrying elements of the French Army from French North Africa to face the Germans invading northern France. She thereafter steamed to contain the Austro-Hungarian Navy in the Adriatic Sea, taking part in the minor Battle of Antivari in August. The ship was transferred to the Dardanelles Division in September, bombarded Ottoman coastal fortifications in November, and thereafter patrolled for contraband being shipped into the Ottoman Empire until mid-December, when she left the area. She saw little activity until 1916 when the Allies began an effort to force Greece to enter the war on their side; she shot down a German zeppelin over Salonika in May and joined a blockade of the country in December. Vérité saw little further activity for the rest of the war, was placed in reserve in 1919 after the war ended, and was sold to Italian ship breakers in 1921.

== Design ==
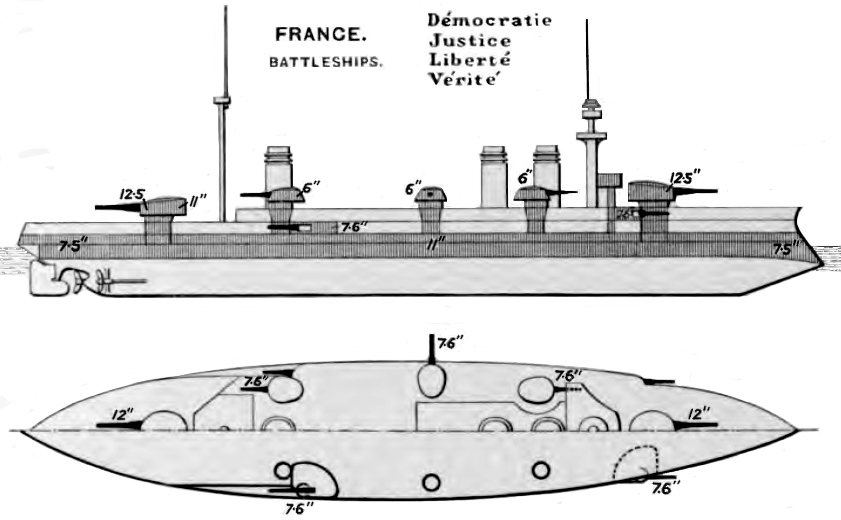
Line-drawing of the Liberté class

The Liberté-class battleships were originally intended to be part of the République-class battleship, which was to total six ships. After work on the first two ships had begun, the British began construction of the King Edward VII-class battleships. These ships carried a heavy secondary battery of 9.2-inch (230 mm) guns, which prompted the French Naval General Staff to request that the last four Républiques be redesigned to include a heavier secondary battery in response. Ironically, the designer, Louis-Émile Bertin, had proposed such an armament for the République class, but the General Staff had rejected it since the larger guns had a lower rate of fire than the smaller 164 mm (6.5 in) guns that had been selected for the République design. Because the ships were broadly similar apart from their armament, the Libertés are sometimes considered to be a sub-class of the République type.

Vérité was 135.25 meters (443 ft 9 in) long overall and had a beam of 24.25 m (79 ft 7 in) and an average draft of 8.2 m (26 ft 11 in). She displaced up to 14,900 metric tons (14,700 long tons) at full load. The battleship was powered by three vertical triple-expansion steam engines, each driving one propeller shaft using steam provided by twenty-two Belleville boilers. They were rated at 17,500 metric horsepower (17,300 ihp) and provided a top speed of 18 knots (33 km/h; 21 mph). Coal storage amounted to 1,800 t (1,800 long tons; 2,000 short tons), which provided a maximum range of 8,400 nautical miles (15,600 km; 9,700 mi) at a cruising speed of 10 knots (19 km/h; 12 mph). She had a crew of 32 officers and 710 enlisted men.

Vérité's main battery consisted of four 305 mm (12 in) Modèle 1893/96 guns mounted in two twin-gun turrets, one forward and one aft of the superstructure. The secondary battery consisted of ten 194 mm (7.6 in) Modèle 1902 guns; six were mounted in single turrets, and four in casemates in the hull. She also carried thirteen 65 mm (2.6 in) Modèle 1902 guns and ten 47 mm (1.9 in) Modèle 1902 guns for defense against torpedo boats. The ship was also armed with two 450 mm (17.7 in) torpedo tubes, which were submerged in the hull on the broadside.

The ship's main belt was 280 mm (11 in) thick in the central citadel, and was connected to two armored decks; the upper deck was 54 mm (2.1 in) thick while the lower deck was 51 mm (2 in) thick, with 70 mm (2.8 in) sloped sides. The main battery guns were protected by up to 360 mm (14.2 in) of armor on the fronts of the turrets, while the secondary turrets had 156 mm (6.1 in) of armor on the faces. The casemates were protected with 174 mm (6.9 in) of steel plate. The conning tower had 266 mm (10.5 in) thick sides.

=== Modifications ===
Over the course of 1912 through 1914, the navy tried to modify Vérité and her sister Démocratie to allow the 305 mm guns to be aimed continuously. Tests to determine whether the main battery turrets could be modified to increase the elevation of the guns (and hence their range) proved to be impossible, but the Navy determined that tanks on either side of the vessel could be flooded to induce a heel of 2 degrees. This increased the maximum range of the guns from 12,500 to 13,500 m (13,700 to 14,800 yd). New motors were installed in the secondary turrets in 1915–1916 to improve their training and elevation rates. Also in 1915, the 47 mm guns located on either side of the bridge were removed and the two on the aft superstructure were moved to the roof of the rear turret. On 8 December 1915, the naval command issued orders that the light battery was to be revised to eight of the 47 mm guns and ten 65 mm (2.6 in) guns. The light battery was revised again in 1916, with four 47 mm guns being converted with high-angle anti-aircraft mounts. They were placed atop the rear main battery turret and the number 7 and 8 secondary turret roofs. In 1912–1913, the ship received two 2 m (6 ft 7 in) Barr & Stroud rangefinders. To direct the anti-aircraft guns, she received a 0.8 m (2 ft 7 in) rangefinder, which was installed on the aft superstructure.

== Service history ==
=== Construction – 1910 ===
Vérité at anchor

Vérité was laid down at the Forges et Chantiers de la Gironde shipyard in Lormont in April 1903, launched on 28 May 1907, and completed on 11 September 1908, over a year after the revolutionary British battleship HMS Dreadnought entered service, which rendered the pre-dreadnoughts like Vérité outdated before they were completed. Before entering service, on 5 July, Vice-amiral (VA—Vice Admiral) Augustin Boué de Lapeyrère came aboard the ship to command a flotilla that included the armored cruiser Dupetit-Thouars, the destroyers Baliste and Arquebuse, and the torpedo cruiser Cassini that was to carry President Armand Fallières for a tour of the Baltic Sea. The ships cruised north to Dunkirk, where Fallières embarked on Vérité, and then continued on into the Baltic, stopping in Copenhagen, Denmark and Stockholm, Sweden. In the latter city, King Gustaf V of Sweden visited Vérité. From there, the ships steamed to Reval, where Czar Nicholas II of Russia visited the ships. The squadron arrived back in Brest on 6 August.

After commissioning on 11 September, Vérité departed Brest for Toulon on 15 September, arriving there on 1 October. She was assigned to the 2nd Division of the Mediterranean Squadron, along with her sisters Justice (the divisional flagship) and Liberté. The 2nd Division ships visited Bizerte in October. The entire squadron was moored in Villefranche in February 1909 and thereafter conducted training exercises off Corsica, followed by a naval review in Villefranche for Fallières on 26 April. On 30 December, Justice, Vérité, and the destroyers Carquois and Fanfare carried relief aid to Messina, Sicily to help survivors of an earthquake there.

Vérité did not operate with the 2nd Division in the first half of 1909. Instead, she joined the rest of the fleet on 27 July for a naval review with the combined Mediterranean and Northern Squadrons in Le Havre for Fallières and Nicholas II, who was visiting the country at the time. A major reception for the two was held aboard Vérité that night. On 12 September, Liberté and the other 2nd Division battleships departed Brest, bound for the United States. There they represented France during the Hudson–Fulton Celebration, which marked the 300th anniversary of the European discovery of the Hudson River. The ships arrived back in Toulon on 27 October. Vérité joined Patrie, République, Justice, Démocratie, and Suffren for a simulated attack on the port of Nice on 18 February 1910. The ships of the 1st Squadron held training exercises off Sardinia and Algeria from 21 May to 4 June, followed by combined maneuvers with the 2nd Squadron from 7 to 18 June. An outbreak of typhoid among the crews of the battleships in early December forced the navy to confine them to Golfe-Juan to contain the fever. By 15 December, the outbreak had subsided.

=== 1911–1914 ===
On 16 April 1911, Vérité hosted Fallières, the Naval Minister Théophile Delcassé, and Charles Dumont, the Minister of Public Works, Posts and Telegraphs, on a cruise to Bizerte in company with the rest of the fleet. They arrived two days later and held a fleet review that included two British battleships, two Italian battleships, and a Spanish cruiser on 19 April. The fleet returned to Toulon on 29 April, where Fallières doubled the crews' rations and suspended any punishments to thank the men for their performance. By 1 August, the battleships of the Danton class had begun to enter service, and they were assigned to the 1st Squadron, displacing the Liberté and République-class ships to the 2nd Squadron. On 4 September, both squadrons held a major fleet review for Fallières off Toulon. The fleet then departed on 11 September for maneuvers off Golfe-Juan and Marseille, returning to Toulon on 16 September. On 25 September, Liberté was destroyed by a magazine explosion, the result of the spontaneous combustion of nitrocellulose gel in her propellant magazines. Debris hurled by the explosion damaged several nearby battleships, including Vérité, though her crew avoided any casualties. Despite the accident, the fleet continued with its normal routine of training exercises and cruises for the rest of the year. These included trips to Les Salins, Le Lavandou, and Porquerolles through 15 December.

In January 1912, Vérité left Bizerte and joined Justice, the battleship Danton, and the destroyers Lansquenet and Carabinier, which were steaming to Malta. The five vessels arrived in Valletta on 22 January, where they met King George V and Queen Mary of Britain, then returning from their voyage to India that year. The 2nd Squadron conducted in maneuvers in April 1912, and on 25 April, Patrie and Vérité steamed to the Hyères roadstead for gunnery training. The two ships, joined by Justice, left Toulon on 21 May for a set of exercises held between Marseille and Villefranche; while at sea, Danton joined them. Danton had now-Amiral (Admiral) Boué de Lapeyrère and the British Prince of Wales aboard. Boué de Lapeyrère inspected both battleship squadrons in Golfe-Juan from 2 to 12 July, after which the ships cruised first to Corsica and then to Bizerte. From there, Boué de Lapeyrère transferred to Vérité for the voyage back to Toulon, and upon arriving there shifted his flag to the battleship Voltaire. On 20 August, the alarm was sounded aboard the ship in Toulon when crewmen noticed thick black smoke pouring from the magazines, prompting fears that the magazines had caught fire. Instead, it turned out that there was a problem with the ventilation system from the boiler rooms, leading to an accumulation of smoke in the boilers.

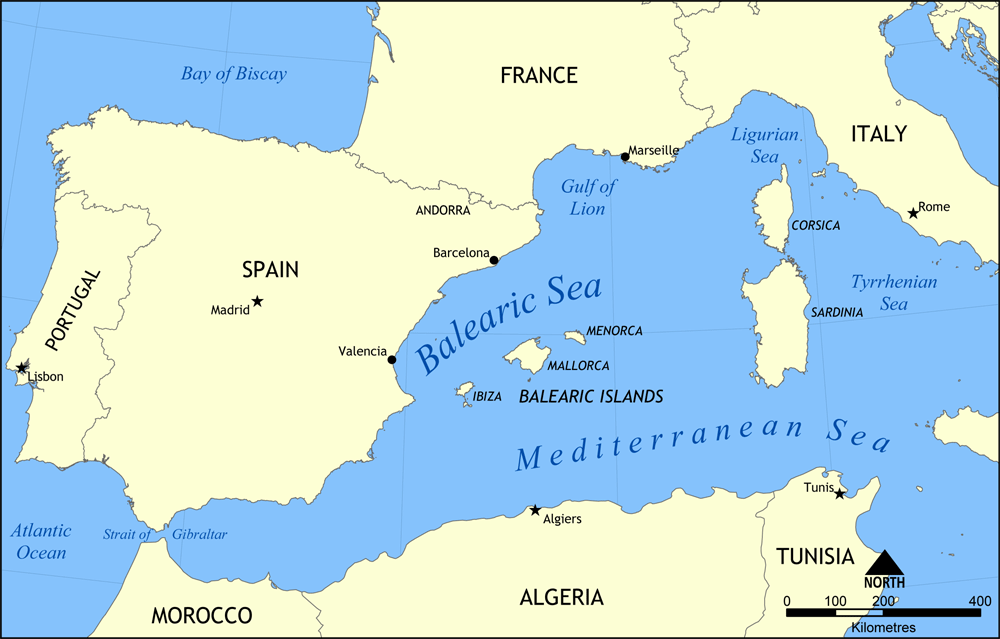
Map of the western Mediterranean, where Vérité spent the majority of her peacetime career

In early 1913, Vérité and the rest of the 2nd Squadron took part in training exercises off Le Lavandou. The French fleet, which by then included sixteen battleships, held large-scale maneuvers between Toulon and Sardinia beginning on 19 May. The exercises concluded with a fleet review for President Raymond Poincaré. Gunnery practice followed from 1 to 4 July. The 2nd Squadron departed Toulon on 23 August with the armored cruisers Jules Ferry and Edgar Quinet and two destroyer flotillas to conduct training exercises in the Atlantic. While en route to Brest, the ships stopped in Tangier, Royan, Le Verdon, La Pallice, Quiberon Bay, and Cherbourg. They reached Brest on 20 September, where they met a Russian squadron of four battleships and five cruisers. The ships then steamed back south, stopping in Cádiz, Tangier, Mers El Kébir, Algiers, and Bizerte before ultimately arriving back in Toulon on 1 November. During this cruise, while moored in Cádiz, Vérité broke free from her anchor and nearly collided with the Spanish ironclad battleship Pelayo. Her stokers quickly got steam up in the boilers, which enabled her to avoid the collision. On 3 December, Vérité, République, Justice, and Démocratie conducted torpedo training and range-finding drills.

The 2nd Squadron moved to Les Salins in early 1914, where they conducted torpedo training on 19 January. Later that month they steamed to Bizerte before returning to Toulon on 6 February. On 4 March, Justice, Démocratie, Vérité, and République joined the 1st Squadron battleships and the 2nd Light Squadron for a visit to Porto-Vecchio, Sardinia. On 30 March, the 2nd Squadron ships steamed to Malta to visit the British Mediterranean Fleet, remaining there until 3 April. On 21 May, the Naval Minister, Armand Gauthier, came aboard Vérité for a cruise to Ajaccio, Corsica; from there, she carried Gauthier to Bizerte. After arriving there on 24 May, he transferred to the new dreadnought Courbet for the voyage back to France. The squadron visited various ports in June, but following the assassination of Archduke Franz Ferdinand and the ensuing July Crisis prompted the fleet to remain close to port, making only short training sorties as international tensions rose.

=== World War I ===
==== Adriatic and Dardanelles operations ====
Following the outbreak of World War I in July 1914, France announced general mobilization on 1 August. The next day, Boué de Lapeyrère ordered the entire French fleet to begin raising steam at 22:15 so the ships could sortie early the next day. Faced with the prospect that the German Mediterranean Division—centered on the battlecruiser Goeben—might attack the troopships carrying the French Army in North Africa to metropolitan France, the French fleet was tasked with providing heavy escort to the convoys. Accordingly, Vérité and the rest of the 2nd Squadron were sent to Algiers, where they joined a group of seven passenger ships that had a contingent of 7,000 troops from XIX Corps aboard. While at sea, the new dreadnought battleships Courbet and Jean Bart and the Danton-class battleships Condorcet and Vergniaud, which took over as the convoy's escort. Instead of attacking the convoys, Goeben bombarded Bône and Philippeville and then fled east to the Ottoman Empire.

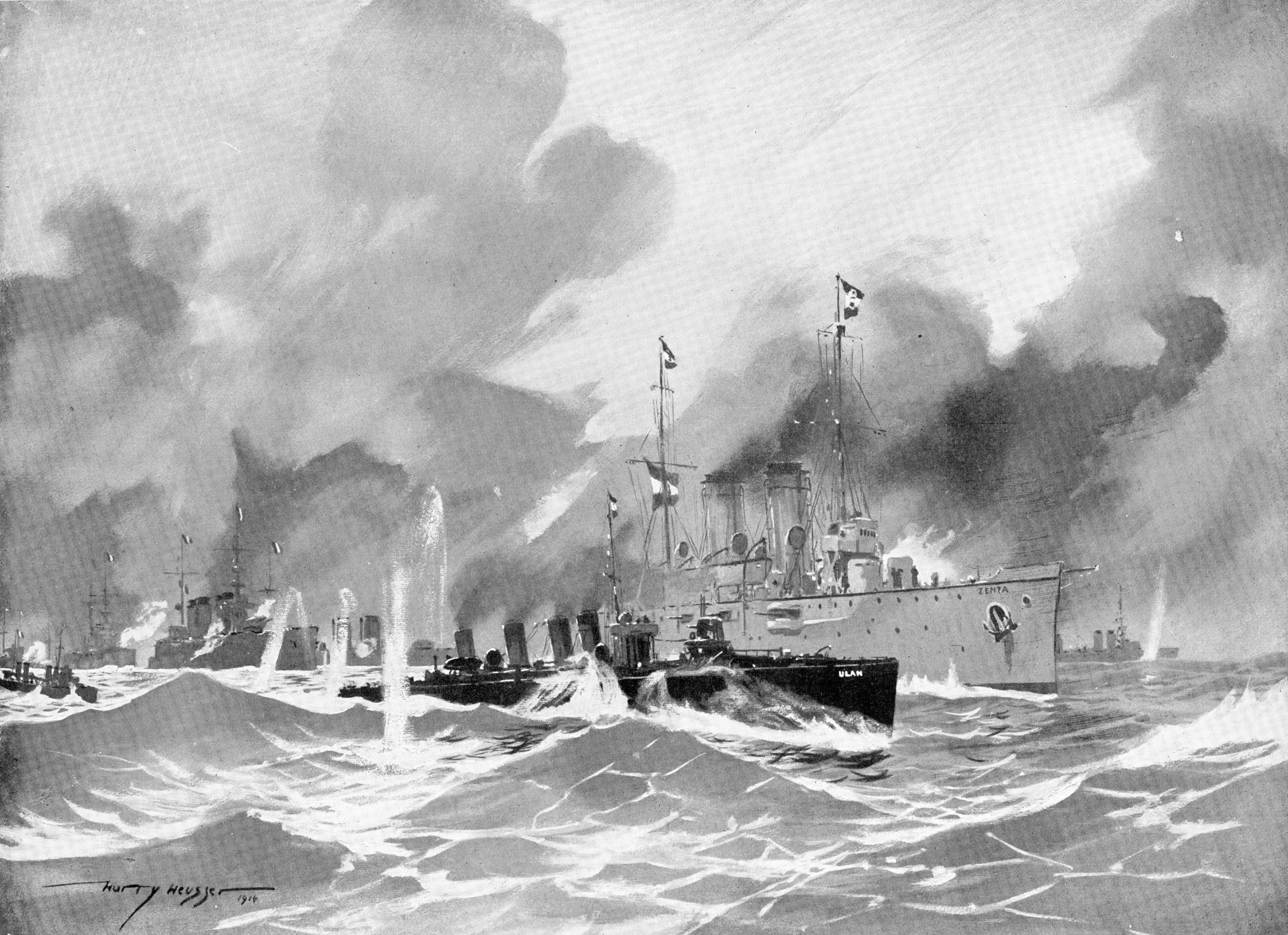
The Austro-Hungarian Zenta and Ulan under fire from the French fleet at the Battle of Antivari

On 12 August, France and Britain declared war on the Austro-Hungarian Empire as the war continued to widen. The 1st and 2nd Squadrons were therefore sent to the southern Adriatic Sea to contain the Austro-Hungarian Navy. On 15 August, the two squadrons arrived off the Strait of Otranto, where they met the patrolling British cruisers HMS Defence and HMS Weymouth north of Othonoi. Boué de Lapeyrère then took the fleet into the Adriatic in an attempt to force a battle with the Austro-Hungarian fleet; the following morning, the British and French cruisers spotted vessels in the distance that, on closing with them, turned out to be the protected cruiser SMS Zenta and the torpedo boat Ulan, which were trying to blockade the coast of Montenegro. In the ensuing Battle of Antivari, Boué de Lapeyrère initially ordered his battleships to fire warning shots, but this caused confusion among the fleet's gunners that allowed Ulan to escape. The slower Zenta attempted to evade, but she quickly received several hits that disabled her engines and set her on fire. She sank shortly thereafter and the Anglo-French fleet withdrew.

On 1 September, the French battleships then bombarded Austrian fortifications at Cattaro on 1 September in an attempt to draw out the Austro-Hungarian fleet, which again refused to take the bait. In addition, many of the ships still had shells loaded from the battle with Zenta, and the guns could not be emptied apart from by firing them. On 18–19 September, the fleet made another incursion into the Adriatic, steaming as far north as the island of Lissa. On 24 September, Vérité was detached to reinforce the Dardanelles Division under the command of Contre-amiral (Rear Admiral) Émile Guépratte, then based at Tenedos. The French and British fleets began to amass a naval force that could defend against a possible sortie by Goeben from the Dardanelles; the fleet comprised the British battlecruisers HMS Indefatigable and Indomitable, which were to engage Goeben, while Vérité and Suffren were to engage the old Ottoman battleships Barbaros Hayreddin and Turgut Reis.

When the predicted sortie of the German and Ottoman ships failed to materialize, the British commander, Admiral Sackville Carden, ordered the four ships to bombard the Ottoman coastal fortifications to test the defenses. The British battlecruisers attacked the fortifications on the European side of the straits, while the French battleships engaged those on the Asian side; both groups made a single pass past their targets that lasted about ten minutes. Suffren led Vérité at a speed of 15 knots (28 km/h; 17 mph), closing to ranges between 12,000 to 13,000 m (13,000 to 14,000 yd) to shell the Kumkale and Orkanie fortresses. Vérité expended a total of twenty-five 194 mm shells at the targets while Suffren employed her 305 mm main battery. The battlecruisers destroyed the magazine in the fortress at Sedd el Bahr and the French ships inflicted significant casualties on the Ottoman garrison, with estimates ranging from 150 to 600 killed and wounded. Guépratte's squadron, which shortly consisted of Vérité, the battleships Charlemagne, Saint Louis, and Gaulois (his flagship), was employed as part of the blockade of the Dardanelles. They were also tasked with patrolling for contraband that was being shipped into the Ottoman Empire either by the port of Smyrna or Dedeağaç, Bulgaria. The British and French were concerned with maintaining naval strength elsewhere, and so Vérité left the Dardanelles Division on 18 December.

==== Operations in Greece ====
Following the evacuation of forces from the Gallipoli campaign in early 1916, the French began gathering forces in the Aegean Sea to put pressure on the Greek government, which had remained neutral in the war. King Constantine I's wife Sophie was the sister of the German Kaiser Wilhelm II, and so he was reluctant to go to war against his brother-in-law, but by that time the French and British had grown weary over his refusal to enter the war on the side of the Allies. Vérité joined the former members of the Dardanelles Division in Salonika, Greece, where on 5 May she and Patrie shot down a German zeppelin conducting reconnaissance in the area. In June, the fleet was formally reorganized, with Vérité, her two sisters, the two République-class ships, and Suffren forming the 3rd Squadron, which was tasked with pressuring the Greek government. Over the course of June and July, the ships alternated between Salonika and Mudros, and later that month the fleet was transferred to Cephalonia.

In August, a pro-Allied group launched a coup against the monarchy in the Noemvriana, which the Allies sought to support. Several French ships sent men ashore in Athens on 1 December to support the coup, but they were quickly defeated by the royalist Greek Army. In response, the British and French fleet imposed a blockade of the royalist-controlled parts of the country. By June 1917, the French and British began to prepare to intervene more directly in the country, and elements of the French fleet was dispersed throughout ports in the country. Vérité was stationed in Piraeus with the cruiser Bruix, but before they could intervene, Constantine abdicated in favor of a pro-Allied government and the Allies lifted the blockade on 16 June. The 3rd Squadron was disbanded, and Vérité returned to the 2nd Squadron on 1 July, which included the other Liberté-class ships and three of the Danton-class battleships. They remained in Corfu, largely immobilized due to shortages of coal, preventing training or any significant operations, which had a negative effect on crew efficiency and morale.

In March 1918, the ship was transferred to Mudros to replace République on the Eastern Division. With the arrival of Justice and Patrie in April and later the two British Lord Nelson-class battleships, the unit was renamed the Salonika Division, meant to counter the possibility of a sortie by Russian warships that had been captured by the Germans at Sevastopol earlier that year. This arrangement did not last long, however, as in July, Vérité and Justice returned to the 2nd Squadron, where they again faced the coal shortages that crippled French fleet operations. In late October, members of the Central Powers began signing armistices with the British and French, signaling the end of the war. The 2nd Squadron ships were sent to Constantinople to oversee the surrender of Ottoman forces.

=== Postwar fate ===
Vérité returned to France and was not involved in the Allied intervention in the Russian Civil War, unlike her sisters. She was reduced to reserve status on 1 August 1919 and did not see further service. She was stricken from the naval register on 18 May 1921, and she was towed to Savona, Italy in September, to be broken up.
