= SS Amiral Magon =

Coordinates: 35.4900°N 20.0200°E

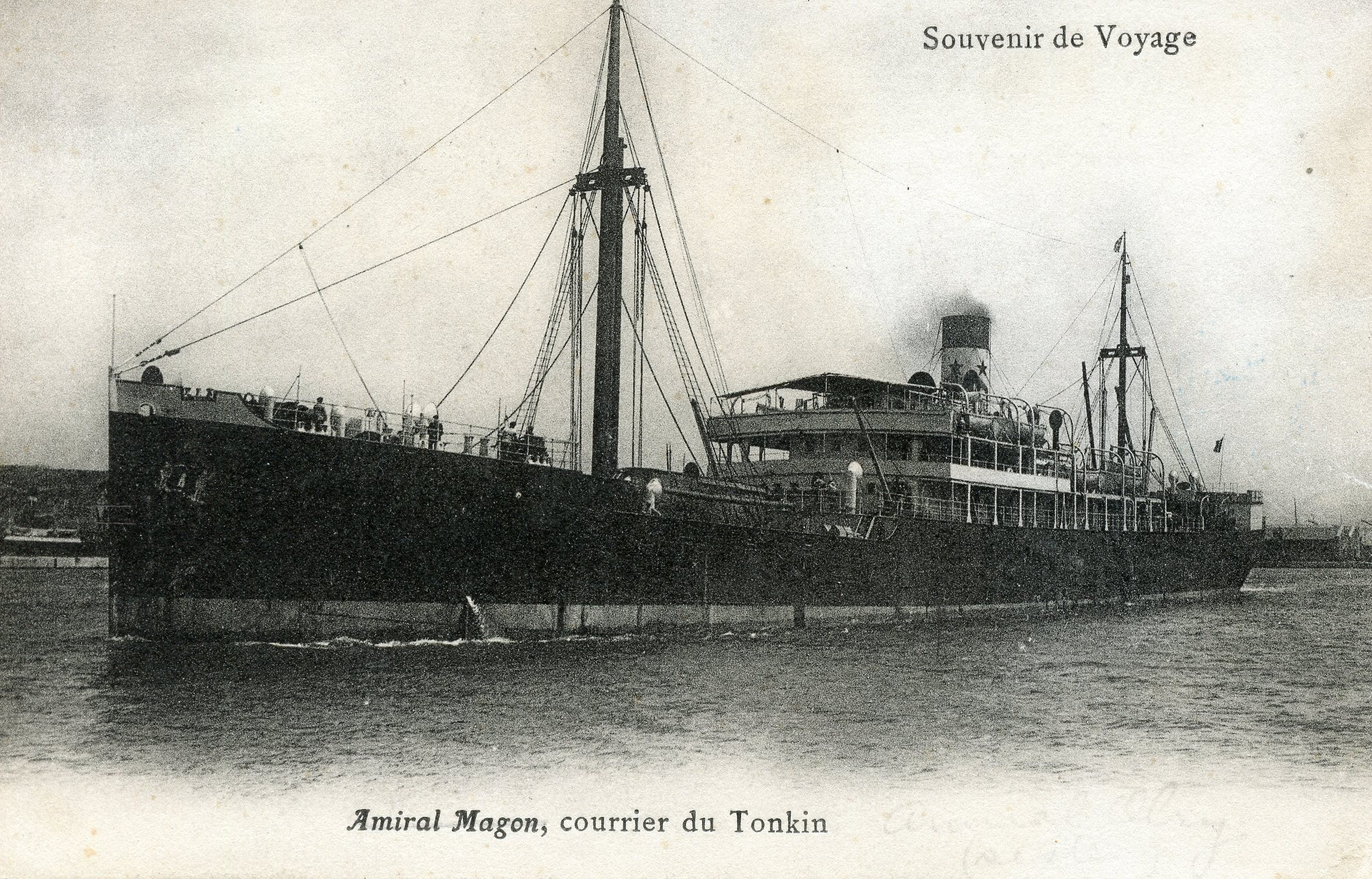
- Amiral Magon

History

France
- Name: SS Amiral Magon
- Owner: Chargeurs Réunis, Le Havre
- Builder: Ateliers et Chantiers de la Loire, Saint-Nazaire
- Completed: 1904
- Fate: Torpedoed and sunk on 28 January 1917

General characteristics
- Type: Ocean liner
- Tonnage: 5,566 GRT
- Length: 119 metres (390 ft 5 in)
- Beam: 15.2 metres (49 ft 10 in)
- Height: 8 metres (26 ft 3 in)
- Installed power: 2.900 metric horsepower (2.133 kW)
- Speed: 12 knots (22 km/h; 14 mph)
- Capacity: passengers

SS Amiral Magon was a French ocean liner converted into a troopship in World War I, which was torpedoed and sunk in the Mediterranean Sea on 28 January 1917 with 203 casualties.

Amiral Magon was built as an ocean liner for service between France and French Indochina. The ship was operational between 1905 and 1914, when she was requisitioned by the French Army and converted into a hospital ship in 1914 and later into a troopship for use in World War I.

On 25 January 1917 she was sailing from Marseille for Thessaloniki with another troopship, SS Pampa, escorted by the French destroyer Arc, with some 935 soldiers and 80 crew on board. She was attacked and torpedoed at 11:10 by German U-boat U-39, commanded by Walther Forstmann. She sank within 10 minutes, 160 nautical miles (300 km; 180 mi) west of Antikythera, causing the death of 203 soldiers. There were also many horses on board. The survivors were rescued by Arc and by another French destroyer, Bombarde, which arrived at the site at 17:00.

== Sources ==
- 40ème Régiment d'Infanterie: testimonies of soldiers on board
- Technical data, discussions
- Wreck site
- Helgason, Guðmundur. "Ships hit during WWI: Amiral Magon". German and Austrian U-boats of World War I - Kaiserliche Marine - Uboat.net.
