= French destroyer Carabine =

Destroyer of the French Navy

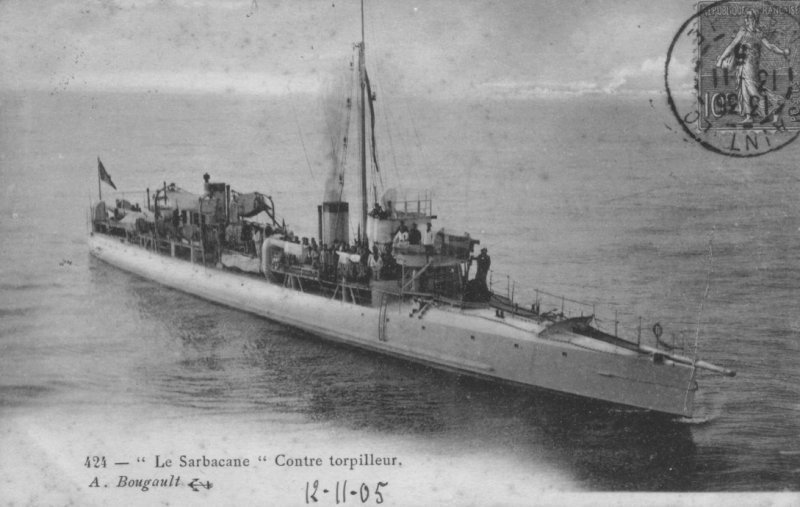
- A postcard of sister ship Sarbacane underway in 1905

History

France
- Name: Carabine
- Namesake: Carbine
- Ordered: 1900
- Builder: Arsenal de Rochefort
- Laid down: May 1901
- Launched: 21 July 1902
- Stricken: 8 January 1919

General characteristics
- Class & type: Arquebuse-class destroyer
- Displacement: 357 t (351 long tons) (deep load)
- Length: 56.58 m (185 ft 8 in) (o/a)
- Beam: 6.38 m (20 ft 11 in)
- Draft: 3.2 m (10 ft 6 in) (deep load)
- Installed power: 2 water-tube boilers; 6,300 ihp (4,698 kW)
- Propulsion: 2 shafts; 2 triple-expansion steam engines
- Speed: 28 knots (52 km/h; 32 mph)
- Range: 2,300 nmi (4,300 km; 2,600 mi) at 10 knots (19 km/h; 12 mph)
- Complement: 4 officers and 58 enlisted men
- Armament: 1 × single 65 mm (2.6 in) gun; 6 × single 47 mm (1.9 in) guns; 2 × single 381 mm (15 in) torpedo tubes

Carabine was a Arquebuse-class destroyer contre-torpilleur d'escadre built for the French Navy in the first decade of the 20th century. Completed in 1903, the ship was assigned to the Mediterranean Squadron (Escadre de la Méditerranée).

== Design and description ==
The Arquebuse class was designed as a faster version of the preceding Durandal class. The ships had an overall length of 56.58 meters (185 ft 8 in), a beam of 6.3 meters (20 ft 8 in), and a maximum draft of 3.2 meters (10 ft 6 in). They normally displaced 307 metric tons (302 long tons) and 357 t (351 long tons) at deep load. The two vertical triple-expansion steam engines each drove one propeller shaft using steam provided by two du Temple Guyot or Normand boilers. The engines were designed to produce a total of 6,300 indicated horsepower (4,700 kW) for a designed speed of 28 knots (52 km/h; 32 mph), all the ships exceeded their contracted speed during their sea trials with Carabine reaching a speed of 30.2 knots (55.9 km/h; 34.8 mph). They carried enough coal to give them a range of 2,300 nautical miles (4,300 km; 2,600 mi) at 10 knots (19 km/h; 12 mph). Their crew consisted of four officers and fifty-eight enlisted men.

The main armament of the Arquebuse-class ships consisted of a single 65-millimeter (2.6 in) gun forward of the bridge and six 47-millimeter (1.9 in) Hotchkiss guns in single mounts, three on each broadside. They were fitted with two single rotating mounts for 381-millimeter (15 in) torpedo tubes on the centerline, one between the funnels and the other on the stern.

== Construction and career ==
Carabine (Carbine) was ordered from Arsenal de Rochefort on 4 May 1900 and the ship was laid down on 15 July 1901. She was launched on 21 July 1902 and conducted her sea trials during May–September 1903. The ship was commissioned (armée definitif) after their completion and was assigned to the Mediterranean Squadron.

On 22 October 1907, Enseigne de vaisseau Charles-Benjamin Ullmo, second in command of Carabine, was arrested near Toulon, after a failed attempt to blackmail the French government, demanding 150,000 Francs for secret documents in his possession, which he would otherwise sell to a foreign power. On investigation, it was found that Ullmo had already attempted to sell the documents to a German agent, but the offer had been rejected because he had demanded too much money (950,000 Francs). Ullmo was tried and convicted of High Treason and sentenced to deportation for life to the penal colony of Devil's Island.

She reduced to reserve while under repair in 1913–1915 at Bizerte, French Tunisia.

On 1 October 1918, Carabine was in collision with the British merchant ship Mentor, and her foredeck and bridge were badly damaged. Carabine was towed to Palermo, Sicily for temporary repair, before being sent to Bizerte, Tunisia. Carabine was condemned on 8 January 1919.

== Bibliography ==
- Couhat, Jean Labayle (1974). French Warships of World War I. London: Ian Allan. ISBN 0-7110-0445-5.
- Datta, Venita (2011). "5 – Opium, Gambling, and the Demimondaine: The Ullmo Spy Case of 1907–1908". Heroes and Legends of Fin-de Siècle France: Gender, Politics and National Identity. Cambridge University Press. pp. 179–225. doi:10.1017/CBO9780511921797.006. ISBN 978-0-521-19595-9.
- Fock, Harald (1989). Z-Vor! Internationale Entwicklung und Kriegseinsätze von Zerstörern und Torpedobooten 1914 bis 1939 (in German). Herford, Germany: Koehlers Verlagsgesellschaft mBH. ISBN 3-7822-0207-4.
- Prévoteaux, Gérard (2017). La marine française dans la Grande guerre: les combattants oubliés: Tome I 1914–1915 [The French Navy during the Great War: The Forgotten Combatants, Book I 1914–1915]. Collection Navires & Histoire des Marines du Mond. Vol. 23. Le Vigen, France: Éditions Lela presse. ISBN 978-2-37468-000-2.
- Prévoteaux, Gérard (2017). La marine française dans la Grande guerre: les combattants oubliés: Tome II 1916–1918 [The French Navy during the Great War: The Forgotten Combatants, Book II 1916–1918]. Collection Navires & Histoire des Marines du Mond. Vol. 27. Le Vigen, France: Éditions Lela presse. ISBN 978-2-37468-001-9.
- Roberts, Stephen S. (2021). French Warships in the Age of Steam 1859–1914: Design, Construction, Careers and Fates. Barnsley, UK: Seaforth Publishing. ISBN 978-1-5267-4533-0.
- Stanglini, Ruggero & Cosentino, Michelle (2022). The French Fleet: Ships, Strategy and Operations, 1870-1918. Barnsley: Seaforth Publishing. ISBN 978-1-5267-0131-2.
