= French destroyer Sabre =

Destroyer of the French Navy

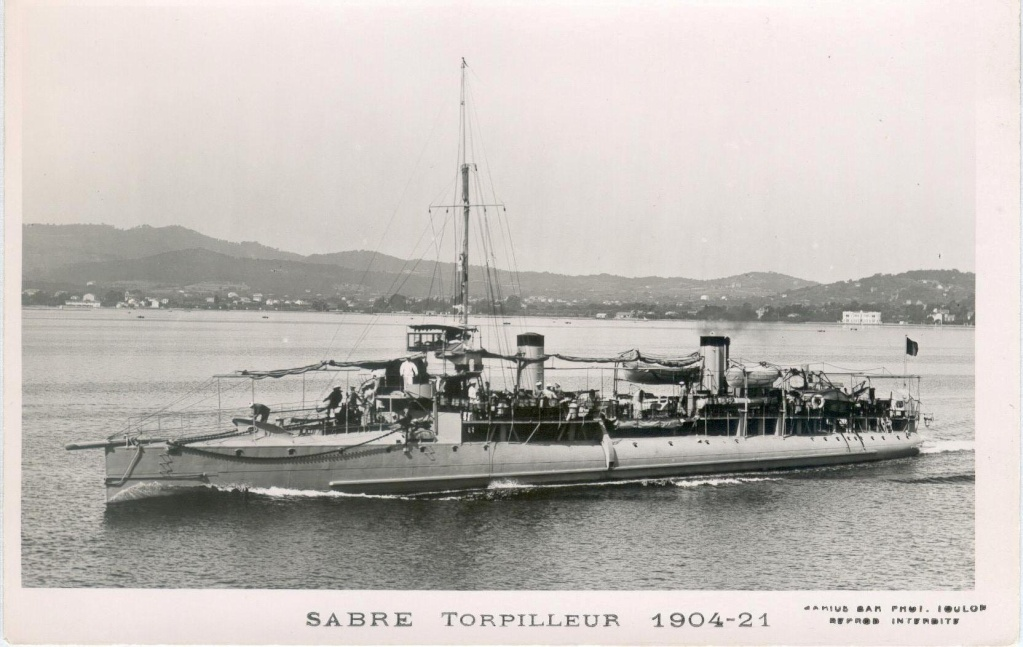
- A postcard of Sabre underway in harbor

History

France
- Name: Sabre
- Namesake: Sabre
- Ordered: 1901
- Builder: Arsenal de Rochefort
- Laid down: 1902
- Launched: 15 April 1904
- Stricken: 5 January 1921

General characteristics
- Class & type: Arquebuse-class destroyer
- Displacement: 357 t (351 long tons) (deep load)
- Length: 56.58 m (185 ft 8 in) (o/a)
- Beam: 6.38 m (20 ft 11 in)
- Draft: 3.2 m (10 ft 6 in) (deep load)
- Installed power: 2 water-tube boilers; 6,300 ihp (4,698 kW)
- Propulsion: 2 shafts; 2 triple-expansion steam engines
- Speed: 28 knots (52 km/h; 32 mph)
- Range: 2,300 nmi (4,300 km; 2,600 mi) at 10 knots (19 km/h; 12 mph)
- Complement: 4 officers and 58 enlisted men
- Armament: 1 × single 65 mm (2.6 in) gun; 6 × single 47 mm (1.9 in) guns; 2 × single 381 mm (15 in) torpedo tubes

Sabre was a Arquebuse-class destroyer contre-torpilleur d'escadre built for the French Navy in the first decade of the 20th century. Completed in 1904, the ship was initially assigned to the Far Eastern Division (Division Navale d’Extrême-Orient). She returned to France in 1907 and was assigned to the Northern Squadron (Escadre du Nord). Sabre became part of a local defense unit (Défense mobile) in Brittany four years later.

When the First World War began in August 1914, the ship was one of the leaders of a submarine flotilla, but was transferred to the Mediterranean Fleet (Escadre de la Méditerranée) in 1915. She was assigned to a patrol squadron in 1918 and was sold for scrap in 1921.

== Design and description ==
The Arquebuse class was designed as a faster version of the preceding Durandal class. The ships had an overall length of 56.58 meters (185 ft 8 in), a beam of 6.3 meters (20 ft 8 in), and a maximum draft of 3.2 meters (10 ft 6 in). They normally displaced 307 metric tons (302 long tons) and 357 t (351 long tons) at deep load. The two vertical triple-expansion steam engines each drove one propeller shaft using steam provided by two du Temple Guyot or Normand boilers. The engines were designed to produce a total of 6,300 indicated horsepower (4,700 kW) for a designed speed of 28 knots (52 km/h; 32 mph), all the ships exceeded their contracted speed during their sea trials with Sabre reaching a speed of 29.7 knots (55.0 km/h; 34.2 mph). They carried enough coal to give them a range of 2,300 nautical miles (4,300 km; 2,600 mi) at 10 knots (19 km/h; 12 mph). Their crew consisted of four officers and fifty-eight enlisted men.

The main armament of the Arquebuse-class ships consisted of a single 65-millimeter (2.6 in) gun forward of the bridge and six 47-millimeter (1.9 in) Hotchkiss guns in single mounts, three on each broadside. They were fitted with two single rotating mounts for 381-millimeter (15 in) torpedo tubes on the centerline, one between the funnels and the other on the stern.

== Construction and career ==
Sabre (Sabre) was ordered from Arsenal de Rochefort on 5 March 1901 and the ship was laid down in 1903. She was launched on 15 May 1904 and conducted her sea trials during May–June. Sabre was commissioned (armement définitif) after their completion and was assigned to the Far Eastern Division. The ship was escorted from Toulon, France, to Saigon, French Indochina, by the protected cruiser Descartes from 10 September to 25 December. The destroyer was transferred to the Northern Squadron in 1907 and was assigned to the local defense unit at Brest in 1911.

In June 1913, she became one of the leaders (divisionnaire) of the 1st Submarine Flotilla (1^{ère} escadrille sous-marins) of the 2nd Light Squadron (2^{e} escadre légère) based at Cherbourg. Sabre was transferred to the Mediterranean Fleet in April 1915 and remained there for the rest of the war. The destroyer ferried King Peter I of Serbia from Valona, Albania, to the island of Corfu off the Greek coast in March 1916. Sabre was based at Port Said, Egypt, from 1917. The ship was assigned to a patrol squadron at Rochefort in 1918–1919. She was struck from the navy list on 15 January 1921 and sold for scrap on 1 June.

== Bibliography ==
- Couhat, Jean Labayle (1974). French Warships of World War I. London: Ian Allan. ISBN 0-7110-0445-5.
- Prévoteaux, Gérard (2017). La marine française dans la Grande guerre: les combattants oubliés: Tome I 1914–1915 [The French Navy during the Great War: The Forgotten Combatants, Book I 1914–1915]. Collection Navires & Histoire des Marines du Mond. Vol. 23. Le Vigen, France: Éditions Lela presse. ISBN 978-2-37468-000-2.
- Prévoteaux, Gérard (2017). La marine française dans la Grande guerre: les combattants oubliés: Tome II 1916–1918 [The French Navy during the Great War: The Forgotten Combatants, Book II 1916–1918]. Collection Navires & Histoire des Marines du Mond. Vol. 27. Le Vigen, France: Éditions Lela presse. ISBN 978-2-37468-001-9.
- Roberts, Stephen S. (2021). French Warships in the Age of Steam 1859–1914: Design, Construction, Careers and Fates. Barnsley, UK: Seaforth Publishing. ISBN 978-1-5267-4533-0.
- Stanglini, Ruggero & Cosentino, Michelle (2022). The French Fleet: Ships, Strategy and Operations, 1870-1918. Barnsley: Seaforth Publishing. ISBN 978-1-5267-0131-2.
