= French destroyer Harpon =

Destroyer of the French Navy

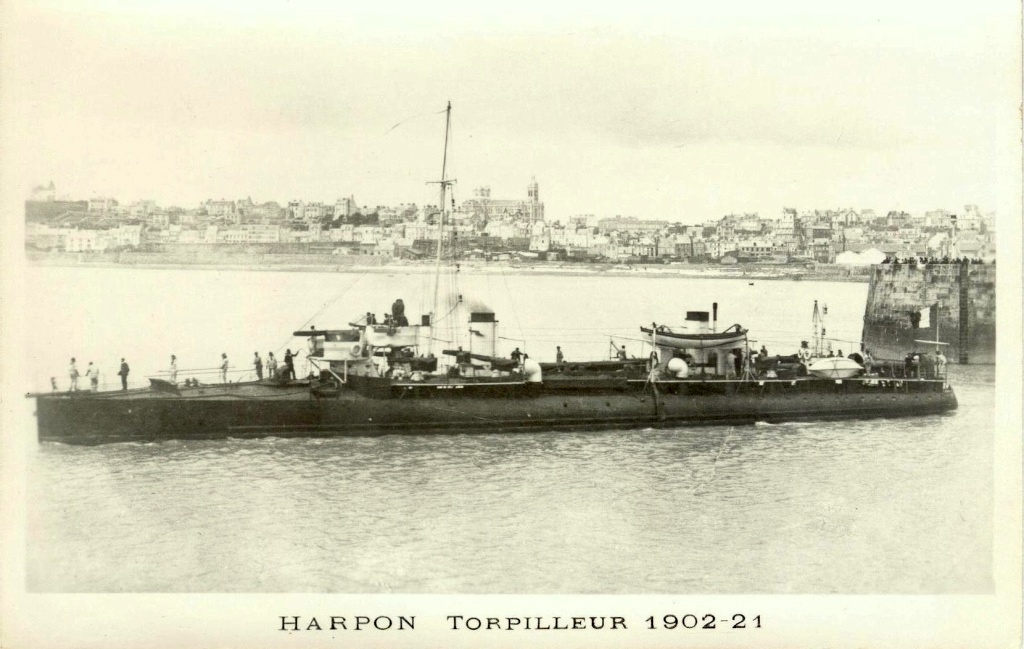
- A postcard of Harpon underway in harbor

History

France
- Name: Harpon
- Namesake: Harpoon
- Ordered: 1900
- Builder: Forges et Chantiers de la Gironde, Lormont
- Laid down: November 1900
- Launched: 20 October 1902
- Stricken: 5 March 1921

General characteristics
- Class & type: Arquebuse-class destroyer
- Displacement: 357 t (351 long tons) (deep load)
- Length: 56.58 m (185 ft 8 in) (o/a)
- Beam: 6.38 m (20 ft 11 in)
- Draft: 3.2 m (10 ft 6 in) (deep load)
- Installed power: 2 water-tube boilers; 6,300 ihp (4,698 kW)
- Propulsion: 2 shafts; 2 triple-expansion steam engines
- Speed: 28 knots (52 km/h; 32 mph)
- Range: 2,300 nmi (4,300 km; 2,600 mi) at 10 knots (19 km/h; 12 mph)
- Complement: 4 officers and 58 enlisted men
- Armament: 1 × single 65 mm (2.6 in) gun; 6 × single 47 mm (1.9 in) guns; 2 × single 381 mm (15 in) torpedo tubes

Harpon was a Arquebuse-class destroyer contre-torpilleur d'escadre built for the French Navy in the first decade of the 20th century. Completed in 1903, the ship was initially assigned to the Northern Squadron (Escadre du Nord).

== Design and description ==
The Arquebuse class was designed as a faster version of the preceding Durandal class. The ships had an overall length of 56.58 meters (185 ft 8 in), a beam of 6.3 meters (20 ft 8 in), and a maximum draft of 3.2 meters (10 ft 6 in). They normally displaced 307 metric tons (302 long tons) and 357 t (351 long tons) at deep load. The two vertical triple-expansion steam engines each drove one propeller shaft using steam provided by two du Temple Guyot or Normand boilers. The engines were designed to produce a total of 6,300 indicated horsepower (4,700 kW) for a designed speed of 28 knots (52 km/h; 32 mph), all the ships exceeded their contracted speed during their sea trials with Harpon reaching a speed of 30.7 knots (56.9 km/h; 35.3 mph). They carried enough coal to give them a range of 2,300 nautical miles (4,300 km; 2,600 mi) at 10 knots (19 km/h; 12 mph). Their crew consisted of four officers and fifty-eight enlisted men.

The main armament of the Arquebuse-class ships consisted of a single 65-millimeter (2.6 in) gun forward of the bridge and six 47-millimeter (1.9 in) Hotchkiss guns in single mounts, three on each broadside. They were fitted with two single rotating mounts for 381-millimeter (15 in) torpedo tubes on the centerline, one between the funnels and the other on the stern.

== Construction and career ==
Harpon (Harpoon) was ordered from Ateliers et Chantiers de la Gironde on 14 November 1900 and the ship was laid down later that month at its shipyard in Bordeaux-Lormont. She was launched on 20 October 1902 and conducted her sea trials from November 1902 to March 1903. The ship was commissioned (armée definitif) after their completion and was assigned to the Northern Squadron.

In July 1909 Harpon was tasked with escorting Hubert Latham's attempt at crossing the pas-de-Calais (or Dover strait) with his Antoinette monoplane aircraft. The antoinette motor, a state of the art but temperamental V8 fuel injected engine failed in mid air and Latham had to ditch some ten miles west of Calais. Newspapers reported that Latham, who couldn't swim and had no lifejacket ( while his rival Bleriot had been provided a motorcycle tyre inner tube as a makeshift life preserver by his mechanics) calmly climbed the tail of his slowly sinking aircraft and lit a cigarette waiting for his escorting destroyer to ome along and fish him out. His aircraft was salvaged (in poor shape) by naval tug Calaisien and bought back to Calais

When the First World War began in August 1914, Harpon was in the reserve of the 2nd Light Squadron (2^{e} escadre légère) based at Cherbourg. The ship was not mobilized until later in the year and was assigned to the Dunkirk Flotilla.

== Bibliography ==
- Couhat, Jean Labayle (1974). French Warships of World War I. London: Ian Allan. ISBN 0-7110-0445-5.
- Prévoteaux, Gérard (2017). La marine française dans la Grande guerre: les combattants oubliés: Tome I 1914–1915 [The French Navy during the Great War: The Forgotten Combatants, Book I 1914–1915]. Collection Navires & Histoire des Marines du Mond. Vol. 23. Le Vigen, France: Éditions Lela presse. ISBN 978-2-37468-000-2.
- Prévoteaux, Gérard (2017). La marine française dans la Grande guerre: les combattants oubliés: Tome II 1916–1918 [The French Navy during the Great War: The Forgotten Combatants, Book II 1916–1918]. Collection Navires & Histoire des Marines du Mond. Vol. 27. Le Vigen, France: Éditions Lela presse. ISBN 978-2-37468-001-9.
- Roberts, Stephen S. (2021). French Warships in the Age of Steam 1859–1914: Design, Construction, Careers and Fates. Barnsley, UK: Seaforth Publishing. ISBN 978-1-5267-4533-0.
- Stanglini, Ruggero & Cosentino, Michelle (2022). The French Fleet: Ships, Strategy and Operations, 1870–1918. Barnsley: Seaforth Publishing. ISBN 978-1-5267-0131-2.
