= Arquebuse-class destroyer =

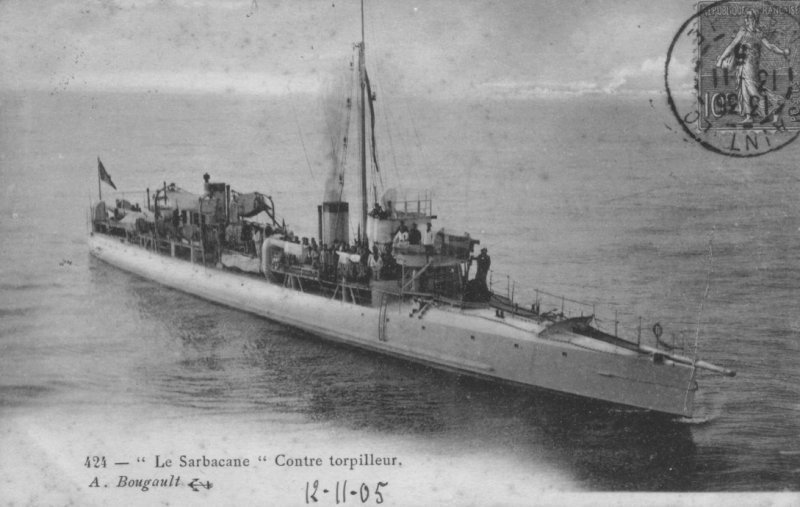
- A postcard of Sarbacane underway in 1905

Class overview
- Name: Arquebuse class
- Operators: French Navy
- Preceded by: Pertuisane-class destroyer
- Succeeded by: Claymore-class destroyer
- Built: 1900–04
- In service: 1903–21
- Completed: 20
- Lost: 2
- Scrapped: 18

General characteristics
- Type: Destroyer
- Displacement: 323 t (318 long tons)
- Length: 58.26 m (191 ft 2 in) (o/a)
- Beam: 6.38 m (20 ft 11 in)
- Draft: 3.2 m (10 ft 6 in)
- Installed power: 6,300 ihp (4,698 kW); 2 Normand or Du Temple boilers
- Propulsion: 2 shafts; 2 Triple-expansion steam engines
- Speed: 28 knots (52 km/h; 32 mph)
- Range: 2,300 nmi (4,300 km; 2,600 mi) at 10 knots (19 km/h; 12 mph)
- Complement: 60
- Armament: 1 × single 65 mm (2.6 in) gun; 6 × single 47 mm (1.9 in) guns; 2 × single 380 mm (15 in) torpedo tubes

The Arquebuse class was a group of 20 destroyers built for the French Navy in the first decade of the 20th century. Two ships were sunk during the First World War and the others were scrapped after the war.

== Losses ==
The Catapulte was sunk after a collision with the British steamship Warrimoo near Bizerte, Tunisia, on 18 May 1918.

The Mousquet was sunk off the entrance of Penang harbour in the Strait of Malacca on 28 October 1914 by the German cruiser SMS Emden, which she was attempting to engage.

== Ships ==
The first 10 ships were provided for in the 1900 Budget, and the second 10 in the 1901 Budget, but all were built under the Programme of 1900. They were numbered M'12 to M'31 respectively.

Name	Ordered	Laid down	Launched	Completed	Fate
Carabine	4 May 1900	15 July 1901	21 July 1902	September 1903	Sold for scrap 26 July 1919 at Bizerte.
Sarbacane	4 May 1900	1 October 1901	12 March 1903	December 1903	Deleted 1 October 1920; still for sale at Toulon in January 1922.
Arquebuse	1 August 1900	1900	15 November 1902	May 1903	Sold for scrap 1 March 1921 at Bizerte.
Arbalète	1 August 1900	23 November 1900	28 April 1903	August 1903	Sold for scrap 10 May 1921 at Toulon.
Mousquet	14 November 1900	November 1900	7 August 1902	June 1903	Sunk 28 October 1914 off Penang.
Javeline	14 November 1900	November 1900	15 October 1902	30 June 1903	Sold for scrap August 1920 at Cherbourg.
Sagaie	7 November 1900	1901	15 November 1902	April 1903	Sold for scrap 12 April 1921 at Lorient.
Épieu	7 November 1900	1901	17 January 1903	July 1903	Sold for scrap 20 May 1922 at Bizerte.
Harpon	14 November 1900	November 1900	20 October 1902	April 1903	Sold for scrap 10 July 1922 at Cherbourg.
Fronde	14 November 1900	January 1901	17 January 1903	April 1903	Sold for scrap 6 May 1920 at Toulon.
Francisque	5 March 1901	5 February 1903	2 March 1904	April 1904	Sold for scrap 10 July 1922 at Cherbourg.
Sabre	5 March 1901	1903	15 April 1904	June 1904	Sold for scrap 1 June 1921 at Rochefort.
Dard	29 May 1901	15 October 1902	10 September 1903	May 1904	Sold for scrap 20 December 1920 at Bizerte.
Baliste	29 May 1901	20 November 1902	22 October 1903	June 1904	Sold for scrap 6 May 1920 at Toulon.
Mousqueton	29 May 1901	1901	4 November 1902	September 1904	Sold for scrap 15 April 1921 at Bizerte.
Arc	29 May 1901	1901	24 December 1902	July 1904	Sold for scrap 9 January 1921 at Toulon.
Pistolet	22 May 1901	September 1901	29 May 1903	21 September 1903	Sold for scrap 6 May 1920 at Toulon.
Bélier	22 May 1901	September 1901	29 May 1903	April 1904	Sold for scrap 20 May 1922 at Bizerte.
Catapulte	29 May 1901	1901	1 April 1903	October 1903	Sunk in collision 18 May 1918 off Bizerte.
Bombarde	29 May 1901	6 December 1901	26 June 1903	26 November 1903	Sold for scrap 20 April 1921 at Rochefort.

== Bibliography ==
- Campbell, N. J. M. (1979). "France". In Chesneau, Roger & Kolesnik, Eugene M. (eds.). Conway's All the World's Fighting Ships 1860–1905. Greenwich: Conway Maritime Press. pp. 283–333. ISBN 0-8317-0302-4.
- Couhat, Jean Labayle (1974). French Warships of World War I. London: Ian Allan. ISBN 0-7110-0445-5.
- Osborne, Eric W. (2005). Destroyers - An Illustrated History of Their Impact. Santa Barbara, California: ABC-Clio. ISBN 1-85109-479-2.
- Jordan, John (2025). "The 300-Tonnes: The First French Torpedo Boat Destroyer". In Jordan, John (ed.). Warship 2025. London: Bloomsbury Publishing. pp. 111–132. ISBN 978-1-4728-6854-1.
- Prévoteaux, Gérard (2017). La marine française dans la Grande guerre: les combattants oubliés: Tome I 1914–1915 [The French Navy during the Great War: The Forgotten Combatants, Book I 1914–1915]. Collection Navires & Histoire des Marines du Mond. Vol. 23. Le Vigen, France: Éditions Lela presse. ISBN 978-2-37468-000-2.
- Prévoteaux, Gérard (2017). La marine française dans la Grande guerre: les combattants oubliés: Tome II 1916–1918 [The French Navy during the Great War: The Forgotten Combatants, Book II 1916–1918]. Collection Navires & Histoire des Marines du Mond. Vol. 27. Le Vigen, France: Éditions Lela presse. ISBN 978-2-37468-001-9.
- Roberts, Stephen S. (2021). French Warships in the Age of Steam 1859–1914: Design, Construction, Careers and Fates. Barnsley, UK: Seaforth Publishing. ISBN 978-1-5267-4533-0.
- Stanglini, Ruggero & Cosentino, Michelle (2022). The French Fleet: Ships, Strategy and Operations, 1870-1918. Barnsley: Seaforth Publishing. ISBN 978-1-5267-0131-2.
