= French destroyer Arc =

Destroyer of the French Navy

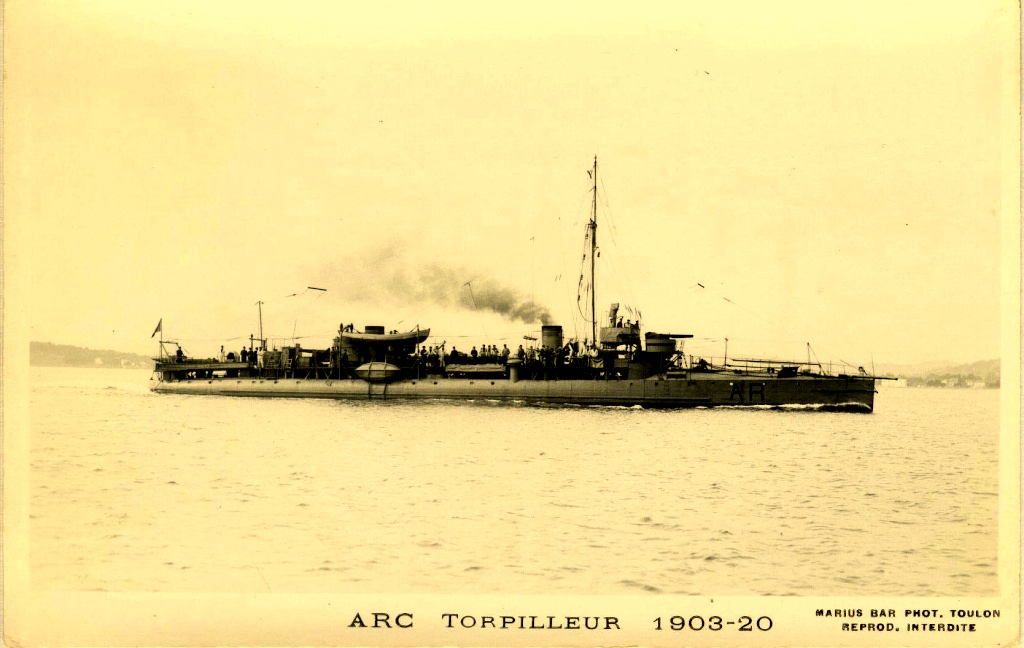
- Arc underway

History

France
- Name: Arc
- Namesake: Bow
- Ordered: 1901
- Builder: Schneider et Cie, Chalon-sur-Saône
- Laid down: 1901
- Launched: 24 December 1902
- Commissioned: July 1904
- Stricken: 1 October 1921
- Fate: Sold for scrap, 9 January 1921

General characteristics
- Class & type: Arquebuse-class destroyer
- Displacement: 357 t (351 long tons) (deep load)
- Length: 56.58 m (185 ft 8 in) (o/a)
- Beam: 6.38 m (20 ft 11 in)
- Draft: 3.2 m (10 ft 6 in) (deep load)
- Installed power: 2 water-tube boilers; 6,300 ihp (4,698 kW)
- Propulsion: 2 shafts; 2 triple-expansion steam engines
- Speed: 28 knots (52 km/h; 32 mph)
- Range: 2,300 nmi (4,300 km; 2,600 mi) at 10 knots (19 km/h; 12 mph)
- Complement: 4 officers and 58 enlisted men
- Armament: 1 × single 65 mm (2.6 in) gun; 6 × single 47 mm (1.9 in) guns; 2 × single 381 mm (15 in) torpedo tubes

Arc was a Arquebuse-class destroyer contre-torpilleur d'escadre built for the French Navy in the first decade of the 20th century. Completed in 1904, the ship was assigned to the Northern Squadron (Escadre du Nord).

== Design and description ==
The Arquebuse class was designed as a faster version of the preceding Durandal class. The ships had an overall length of 56.58 meters (185 ft 8 in), a beam of 6.3 meters (20 ft 8 in), and a maximum draft of 3.2 meters (10 ft 6 in). They normally displaced 307 metric tons (302 long tons) and 357 t (351 long tons) at deep load. The two vertical triple-expansion steam engines each drove one propeller shaft using steam provided by two du Temple Guyot or Normand boilers. The engines were designed to produce a total of 6,300 indicated horsepower (4,700 kW) for a designed speed of 28 knots (52 km/h; 32 mph), all the ships exceeded their contracted speed during their sea trials with Arc reaching a speed of 28.9 knots (53.5 km/h; 33.3 mph). They carried enough coal to give them a range of 2,300 nautical miles (4,300 km; 2,600 mi) at 10 knots (19 km/h; 12 mph). Their crew consisted of four officers and fifty-eight enlisted men.

The main armament of the Arquebuse-class ships consisted of a single 65-millimeter (2.6 in) gun forward of the bridge and six 47-millimeter (1.9 in) Hotchkiss guns in single mounts, three on each broadside. They were fitted with two single rotating mounts for 381-millimeter (15 in) torpedo tubes on the centerline, one between the funnels and the other on the stern.

== Construction and career ==
Arc (Bow) was ordered from Schneider et Cie on 29 May 1901 and the ship was laid down later that year at its shipyard in Chalons-sur-Saône. She was launched on 24 December 1902 and conducted her sea trials from July 1903 to July 1904. The ship was commissioned (armée definitif) after their completion and was assigned to the Mediterranean Squadron.

When the First World War began in August 1914, Arc was a leader (divisionnaire) in the 2nd Submarine and Destroyer Flotilla (2^{e} escadrille sous-marins et torpilleurs) of the 1st Naval Army (1^{ère} Armée navale), based at Bizerte, French Tunisia.

== Bibliography ==
- Couhat, Jean Labayle (1974). French Warships of World War I. London: Ian Allan. ISBN 0-7110-0445-5.
- Prévoteaux, Gérard (2017). La marine française dans la Grande guerre: les combattants oubliés: Tome I 1914–1915 [The French Navy during the Great War: The Forgotten Combatants, Book I 1914–1915]. Collection Navires & Histoire des Marines du Mond. Vol. 23. Le Vigen, France: Éditions Lela presse. ISBN 978-2-37468-000-2.
- Prévoteaux, Gérard (2017). La marine française dans la Grande guerre: les combattants oubliés: Tome II 1916–1918 [The French Navy during the Great War: The Forgotten Combatants, Book II 1916–1918]. Collection Navires & Histoire des Marines du Mond. Vol. 27. Le Vigen, France: Éditions Lela presse. ISBN 978-2-37468-001-9.
- Roberts, Stephen S. (2021). French Warships in the Age of Steam 1859–1914: Design, Construction, Careers and Fates. Barnsley, UK: Seaforth Publishing. ISBN 978-1-5267-4533-0.
- Stanglini, Ruggero & Cosentino, Michelle (2022). The French Fleet: Ships, Strategy and Operations, 1870-1918. Barnsley: Seaforth Publishing. ISBN 978-1-5267-0131-2.
