= Canon de 65 mm Modèle 1891 =

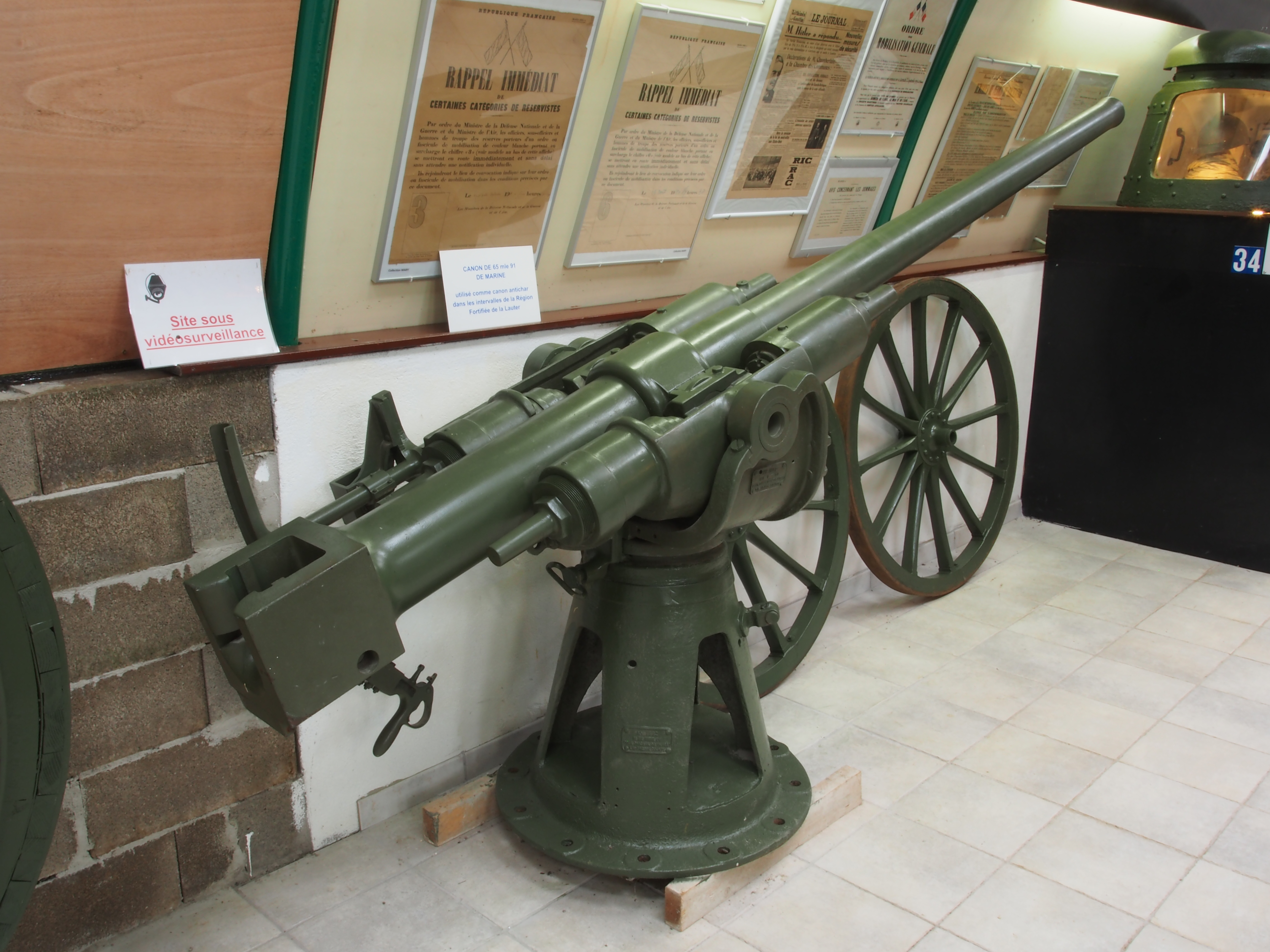
- Fort de Fermont museum - Canon de 65 MLE 1891
- Type: Naval gun Coastal Artillery
- Place of origin: France

Service history
- In service: 1891–1945
- Used by: France; Bulgaria; China; Greece; Ottoman Empire; Peru
- Wars: World War I World War II

Production history
- Designer: Schneider et Cie
- Designed: 1891
- Manufacturer: Schneider et Cie
- Produced: 1891

Specifications
- Mass: 540 kg (1,190 lb)
- Length: 3.4 m (11 ft 2 in)
- Barrel length: 3.2 m (10 ft 6 in) 50 caliber
- Shell: Fixed quick-fire 65 x 470R
- Shell weight: 4 kg (8 lb 13 oz)
- Caliber: 65 mm (2.6 in)
- Breech: Vertical sliding-wedge
- Recoil: Hydro-pneumatic
- Carriage: High-Angle/Low-Angle
- Traverse: 360°
- Muzzle velocity: 715 m/s (2,350 ft/s)

Canon de 65 mm Modèle 1902

Service history
- In service: 1902–1945

Production history
- Designer: Schneider et Cie
- Designed: 1902
- Manufacturer: Schneider et Cie
- Produced: 1902

Specifications
- Mass: 594 kg (1,310 lb)
- Length: 3.4 m (11 ft 2 in)
- Barrel length: 3.2 m (10 ft 6 in) 50 caliber
- Shell: Fixed quick-fire 65 x 525R
- Shell weight: 4.17 kg (9 lb 3 oz)
- Caliber: 65 mm (2.6 in)
- Breech: Vertical sliding-wedge
- Recoil: Hydro-pneumatic
- Carriage: High-Angle/Low-Angle
- Traverse: 360°
- Muzzle velocity: 870 m/s (2,900 ft/s)

The Canon de 65 mm Modèle 1891 & Modèle 1902 were a family of widely used naval guns of the French Navy that were also used by the Ottoman Navy during World War I. Guns removed from decommissioned ships also saw use as coastal artillery and as fortress guns in the Maginot Line fortifications during World War II.

== Construction ==
The Canon de 65 mm Modèle 1891 & Modèle 1902 were developed and built by Schneider at the Le Creusot works. The guns were constructed of an A tube, a jacket, a wedge breech block, a locking ring, a trunnion hoop and used fixed quick fire ammunition. The Modèle 1891 & Modèle 1902 had similar dimensions, but the Modèle 1902 fired a slightly heavier projectile at a higher muzzle velocity. Both models are sometimes referred to as 9-pounders in English publications.

== History ==
The Canon de 65 mm Modèle 1891 & Modèle 1902 were mainly used as anti-torpedo boat defense aboard armored cruisers, destroyers, ironclads, pre-dreadnought battleships, protected cruisers, seaplane carriers and torpedo gunboats.

=== Armored cruisers ===
- Amiral Charner-class - The tertiary armament of this class of four armored cruisers consisted of four M1891 guns in single mounts amidships.
- Dupuy de Lôme - The tertiary armament of this ship consisted of four M1891 guns in single mounts amidships.
- Edgar Quinet-class - The secondary armament of this class of two armored cruisers consisted of twenty casemated M1902 guns in single mounts amidships.
- Ernest Renan - The tertiary armament of this class of two armored cruisers consisted of sixteen casemated M1902 guns in single mounts amidships.

=== Destroyers ===
- Arquebuse-class - The primary armament of this class of twenty ships consisted of one M1891 gun.
- Bisson-class - The secondary armament of this class of six ships consisted of four M1902 guns in single mounts.
- Bouclier-class - The secondary armament of this class of twelve ships consisted of four M1902 guns in single mounts.
- Branlebas-class - The primary armament of this class of ten ships consisted of one M1902 gun.
- Chasseur-class - The primary armament of this class of six ships consisted of six M1902 guns. The destroyer Actée from this class was sold to Peru before completion.
- Claymore-class - The primary armament of this class of thirteen ships consisted of one M1902 gun.
- Durandal-class - The primary armament of this class of four ships consisted of one M1891 gun. The Ottoman Navy ordered four destroyers in 1906 which they called the Samsun-class which were nearly identical.
- Enseigne Roux-class - The secondary armament of this class of two ships consisted of four M1902 guns.
- Framée-class - The primary armament of this class of four ships consisted of one M1891 gun.
- Pertuisane-class - The primary armament of this class of four ships consisted of one M1891 gun.
- Spahi-class destroyer - The primary armament of this class of seven ships consisted of six M1902 guns.
- Voltigeur-class - The primary armament of this class of two ships consisted of six M1902 guns.

=== Ironclads ===
- Amiral Duperré - The quaternary armament of this ship consisted of two M1891 guns in single mounts after 1890s refits.
- Dévastation-class - The quaternary armament of class this ship consisted of two or four M1891 guns in single mounts after 1890s refits.
- Hoche - The quaternary armament of this ship consisted of four M1891 guns in single mounts after 1890s refits.
- Hydra-class - The quaternary armament of this class of three Greek ships consisted of eight casemated M1891 guns in single mounts after 1890s refits.
- Marceau-class - The tertiary armament of this class of three ships consisted of six casemated M1891 guns in single mounts.
- Redoutable - The tertiary armament of this ship consisted of five M1891 guns in single mounts after 1890s refits.

=== Pre-dreadnought battleships ===
- French battleship Brennus - The tertiary armament of this ship consisted of four M1891 guns in single mounts.
- French battleship Charles Martel - The quaternary armament of this ship consisted of four M1891 guns in single mounts.
- French battleship Carnot - The quaternary armament of this ship consisted of four M1891 guns in single mounts.
- French battleship Jauréguiberry - The quaternary armament of this ship consisted of four M1891 guns in single mounts.
- République-class battleship - The tertiary armament of this class of two battleships included thirteen M1902 guns in single mounts.
- Liberté-class battleship - The tertiary armament of this class of four battleships consisted of thirteen M1902 guns in single mounts.>

=== Protected cruisers ===
- Jean Bart-class cruiser - The tertiary armament of this class of two protected cruisers consisted of two M1891 guns in single mounts.
- Alger

=== Seaplane carrier ===
- Foudre - The secondary armament of this ship consisted of four M1891 guns in single mounts.

=== Torpedo gunboat ===
- Nadezhda - The secondary armament of this ship consisted of two M1891 guns in single mounts.
