= French ship Branlebas =

At least two ships of the French Navy have been named Branlebas:

- French destroyer Branlebas, a Branlebas-class destroyer launched in 1907 and sunk in 1915
- French torpedo boat Branlebas, a La Melpomène-class torpedo boat commissioned in 1938, seized by the United Kingdom in June 1940 and foundered in December of that year
