= French submarine Mariotte =

French Navy's submarine

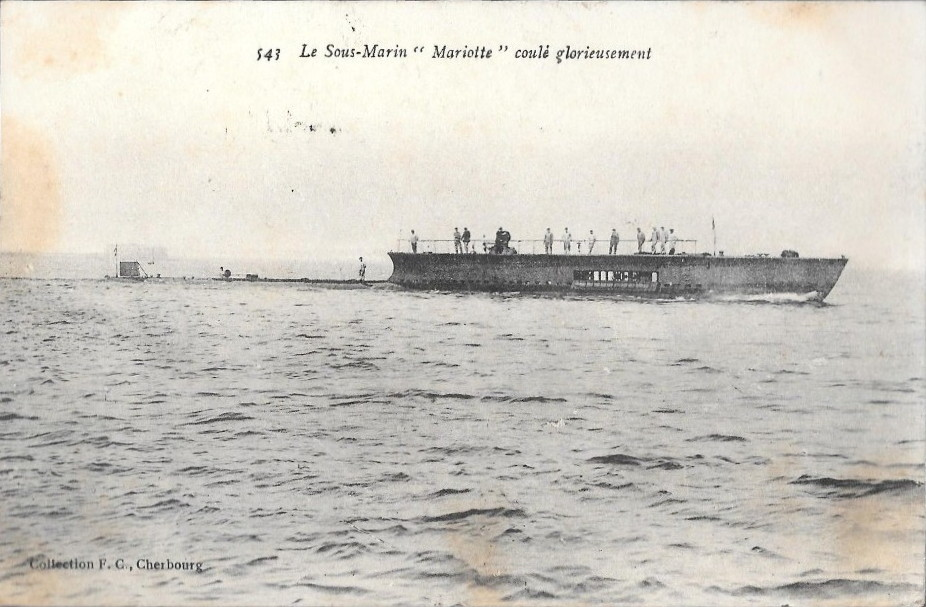
- A postcard of Mariotte on sea trials, Cherbourg, circa 1912. The doors for the Drzewiecki drop collar are open.

Class overview
- Name: Mariotte
- Operators: French Navy
- Preceded by: Archimède
- Succeeded by: Amiral Bourgois

History

France
- Name: Mariotte
- Namesake: Edme Mariotte
- Ordered: 31 December 1906
- Builder: Arsenal de Cherbourg
- Laid down: 30 March 1908
- Launched: 2 February 1911
- Commissioned: 5 February 1913
- Nickname(s): Brosse à dents (toothbrush)
- Fate: Scuttled, 26 July 1915

General characteristics
- Type: Submarine
- Displacement: 545 t (536 long tons) (surfaced); 664 t (654 long tons) (submerged)
- Length: 64.75 m (212 ft 5 in) (p/p)
- Beam: 4.3 m (14 ft 1 in)
- Draft: 3.82 m (12 ft 6 in)
- Depth: 7.25 m (23 ft 9 in)
- Installed power: 2 × 700 PS (515 kW) (diesel); 2 × 500 PS (368 kW) (electric)
- Propulsion: 2 × propeller shafts; 2 × diesel engines, surfaced; 2 × electric motors, submerged
- Speed: 14.2 knots (26.3 km/h; 16.3 mph) (surfaced); 11.7 knots (21.7 km/h; 13.5 mph) (submerged)
- Range: 1,658 nmi (3,071 km; 1,908 mi) at 10 knots (19 km/h; 12 mph) (surfaced); 143 nmi (265 km; 165 mi) at 5 knots (9.3 km/h; 5.8 mph) (submerged)
- Test depth: 35 m (114 ft 10 in)
- Complement: 32 officers and enlisted men
- Armament: 4 × 450 mm (17.7 in) bow torpedo tubes; 2 × Drzewiecki drop collars; 8 torpedoes

The French submarine Mariotte was a submarine built for the French Navy prior to World War I. Intended to accompany the fleet, she was designed for high speed on the surface. Although the navy was unsatisfied with her performance on the surface, the boat had a higher underwater speed than any French submarine before or during the following 35 years. Mariotte was plagued with engine problems during her construction and the navy spent years fixing the various issues before finally commissioning her five years after beginning construction. During the war, she participated in the Dardanelles Campaign, but had to be scuttled after she became entangled in the cables of a minefield on her first attempt to penetrate the Dardanelles.

== Design and description ==
Mariotte was the winning design in a competition conducted by the Ministère de la Marine (Navy Ministry) in 1906 for a submarine displacing 530 metric tons (520 long tons) that could accompany a squadron of battleships on the surface and had a submerged range of 100 nautical miles (190 km; 120 mi). The winning design, by Constructor, First Class (Ingénieur de 1ère classe) Charles Radiguer, was optimized for good sea-keeping qualities and high speed with moderate buoyancy, a long, thin single hull, and high freeboard. The most unusual feature of his design was the prominent forecastle that was built atop the forward part of the pressure hull, while the rear was virtually awash. This odd configuration gave the boat her nickname of toothbrush (brosse à dents).

The submarine actually displaced slightly more than planned, 545 metric tons (536 long tons) surfaced and 634 metric tons (624 long tons) submerged. She measured 64.75 meters (212 ft 5 in) between perpendiculars and had a beam of 4.3 meters (14 ft 1 in). Mariotte had a maximum draft of 3.82 meters (12 ft 6 in) and had a depth of 7.25 meters (23 ft 9 in) from the bottom of her keel to the top of the conning tower. This latter was faired into the rear of the forecastle. Two lead weights were located in the keel and could be dropped in an emergency.

Her hull was divided into nine compartments and she was fitted with five internal trim tanks, an internal central ballast tank and three external ballast tanks. She had a test depth of 35 meters (115 ft). Mariotte had two rudders, one above the waterline for submerged use and the other below the waterline for regular use. She had two sets of diving planes, fore and aft, to control her depth below the water. The boat was evaluated in 1914 and the commission felt that she was generally successful except for her surface speed and range. It noted that she had problems with a following sea as the superstructure rapidly filled with water, but drained slowly so that she was much heavier by the bow and would tend to wallow. It also felt that she was insufficiently buoyant and had mediocre stability on the surface.

For surface running, the boat was powered by two Sautter & Harlé six-cylinder, 700-metric-horsepower (690 bhp; 515 kW) diesel engines, each driving a 1.72-meter (5 ft 8 in) propeller. When submerged each propeller was driven by a Breguet 500-metric-horsepower (493 shp; 368 kW) electric motor using electricity from two 124-cell batteries. Mariotte could reach 14.2 knots (26.3 km/h; 16.3 mph) on the surface and 11.7 knots (21.7 km/h; 13.5 mph) underwater. This latter speed was a record that would not be exceeded by a French submarine for 35 years. On the surface, the boat had a range of 1,658 nmi (3,071 km; 1,908 mi) at 10 knots (19 km/h; 12 mph), submerged, she had a range of 143 nmi (265 km; 165 mi) at 5 knots (9.3 km/h; 5.8 mph).

She was armed with four internal 45 cm (17.7 in) torpedo tubes in the bow and two Drzewiecki drop collars in the forecastle. Two reloads were stowed internally, which gave her a total of eight torpedoes. During World War I, the boat probably used Modèle 1911V torpedoes. These had a 110-kilogram (240 lb) warhead and a range of 2,000 meters (2,200 yd) at a speed of 36 knots (67 km/h; 41 mph).

== Construction and service ==
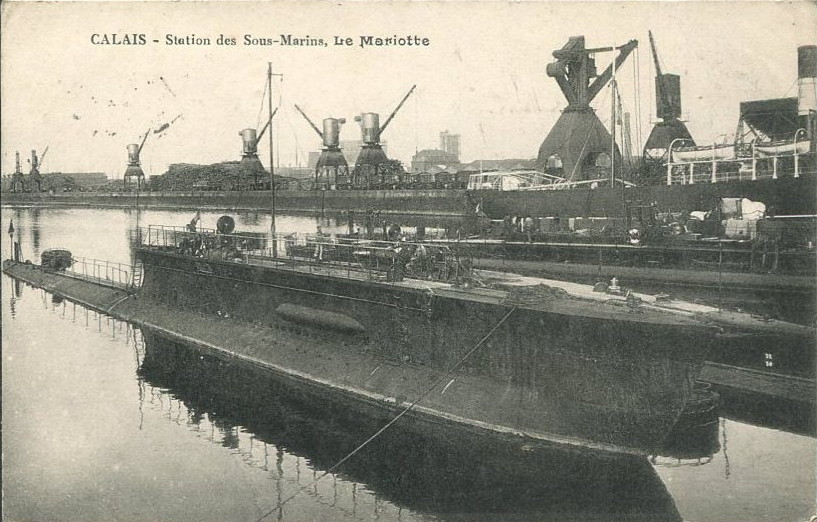
Mariotte at anchor, Calais, 1912–14

Mariotte, named after the physicist Edme Mariotte, was ordered from the Arsenal de Cherbourg on 31 December 1906. The boat was laid down on 30 March 1908 and launched on 2 February 1911 with only the starboard electric motor in place. The port electric motor was under repair at the time and was installed from 3 May to 21 June and a brief series of trials were conducted. The boat was refitted and further repairs were made to the port-side motor, although continuing problems with her propulsion system often immobilized Mariotte into 1912. She was able, however, to conduct diving, torpedo and underwater speed trials in August and September 1911. The boat was lightly damaged when the air heater of a Modèle 1909R torpedo exploded in its tube on 27 December. Her diesel engines, three years delayed by problems during factory testing, were installed from 1 March to 28 July 1912. They were judged satisfactory after the oil sump and the compressors were changed. After repeated breakdowns, Mariotte conducted her testing of the diesels from 23 October to 11 December and she was finally commissioned (armament définitif) on 5 February 1913 after a complete overhaul of her propulsion system.

The boat was assigned to the 2nd Division (escadrille) of the Light Squadron of submarines on 16 January and she joined them at Calais on 11 February. Mariotte visited Brest on 20 February and was inspected by Rear Admiral Charles Eugène Favereau. During the inspection the oil-fired galley stove in the forecastle exploded, lightly burning two sailors. The boat was in Calais for the visit of King Christian X of Denmark later in the year.

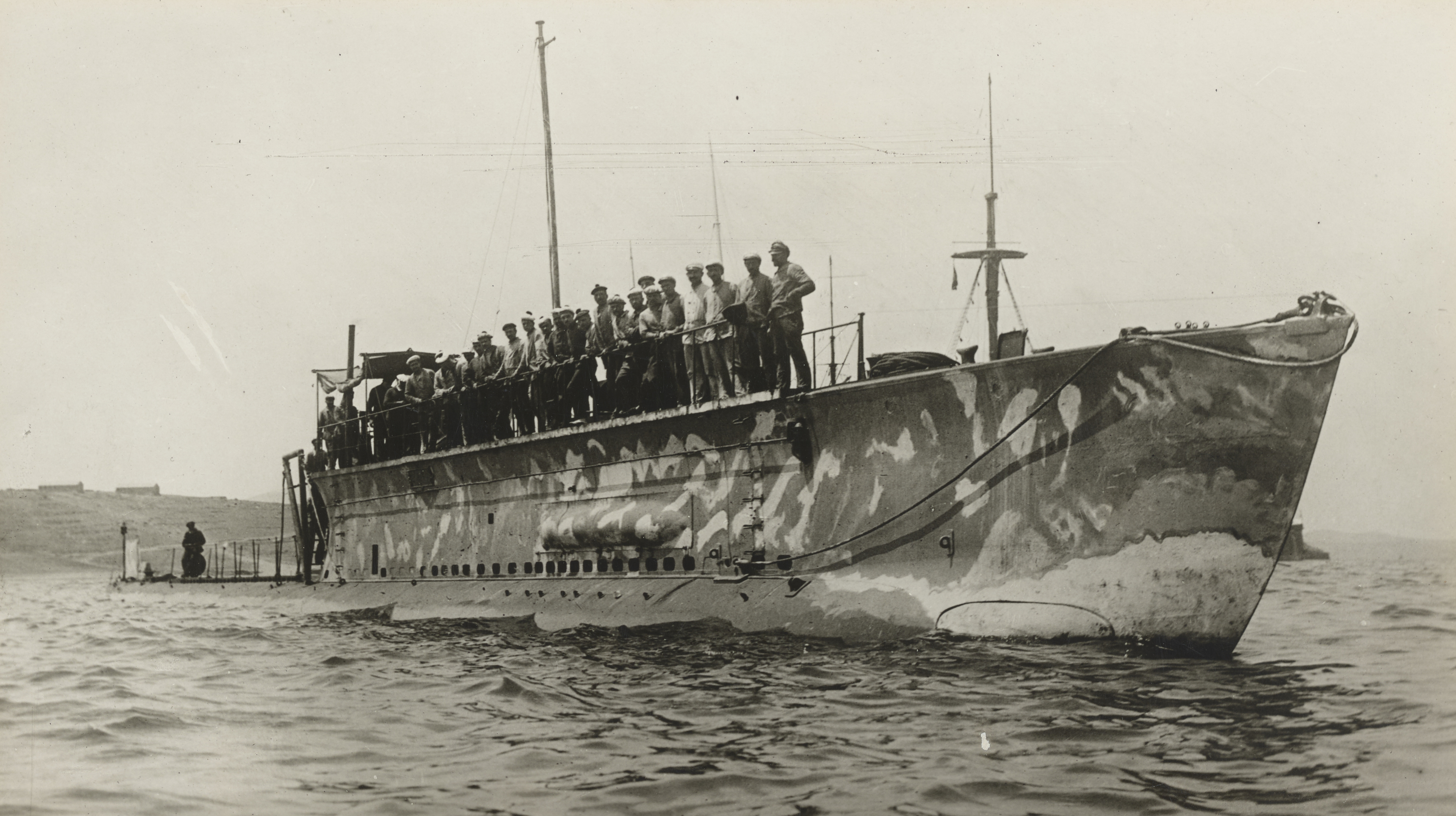
The crew lined up at Mudros, July 1915

When World War I began in August 1914, Mariotte was transferred to the Mediterranean Squadron at Toulon where she patrolled off the coast of Provence. In July 1915, she was transferred to Mudros to attempt to penetrate the Dardanelles. After making a reconnaissance flight over the straits and having studied the reports of the British submarines that had successfully entered the Dardanelles, Lieutenant de vaisseau Auguste Farbre ordered his crew to cast off on the evening of 25 July. Escorted by the French destroyer Poignard to the mouth of the Dardanelles, she rounded Cape Helles on the surface, but dived to avoid being spotted by a searchlight about an hour later and attempted to pass underneath a minefield near Çanakkale. The boat became entangled in the cables and when she surfaced in an unsuccessful attempt to free herself, she was immediately engaged by a Turkish gun battery at close range. Mariotte could not submerge because her conning tower had been penetrated by shells so Farbre decided to scuttle the boat and surrender. The Turks ceased fire when he signaled his surrender and so his crew was able to destroy documents and equipment before opening the seacocks to sink the submarine. The wreck lies off Cape Nara near a Turkish naval base at a depth of 5 meters (16 ft).

== See also ==
- List of submarines of France

== Bibliography ==
- Caresse, Phillipe (2015). "The Submarine Mariotte: Known as the 'Toothbrush'". In Jordan, John (ed.). Warship 2015. London: Conway. pp. 81–89. ISBN 978-1-84486-276-4.
- Friedman, Norman (2011). Naval Weapons of World War One: Guns, Torpedoes, Mines and ASW Weapons of All Nations; An Illustrated Directory. Barnsley, UK: Seaforth Publishing. ISBN 978-1-84832-100-7.
- Garier, Gérard (1998). Des Émeraude (1905-1906) au Charles Brun (1908–1933) [From Émeraude (1905–1906) to Charles Brun (1908–1933)]. L'odyssée technique et humaine du sous-marin en France (in French). Vol. 2. Bourg-en-Bresse, France: Marines édition. ISBN 2-909675-34-3.
