= Q82 =

Q82 may refer to:

- Q82 (New York City bus)
- Al-Infitar, a surah of the Quran
- French submarine Amiral Bourgois
