= French ship Oriflamme =

At least two ships of the French Navy have borne the name Oriflamme:

- French ship Oriflamme (1744), a 56-gun ship of the line
- French destroyer Oriflamme, a Branlebas-class destroyer
