= Charles Brun =

Charles Brun may refer to:

- Charles Brun (France) (1821–1897), French engineer and politician
- Charles Brun (Denmark) (1866–1919), Danish politician, Finance Minister of Denmark between 1908–1909

== See also ==
- Charles Le Brun (1619–1690), French painter and art theorist
