= Oriflamme (disambiguation) =

The Oriflamme was the battle standard of the King of France.

Oriflamme may also refer to:

- Oriflame, a Swedish cosmetic group
- French ship Oriflamme (1744), a 56-gun ship of the line
- French destroyer Oriflamme, a Branlebas-class destroyer
- L'oriflamme (opera)
- Oriflamme Canyon in San Diego County, California
