= French destroyer Glaive =

Destroyer of the French Navy

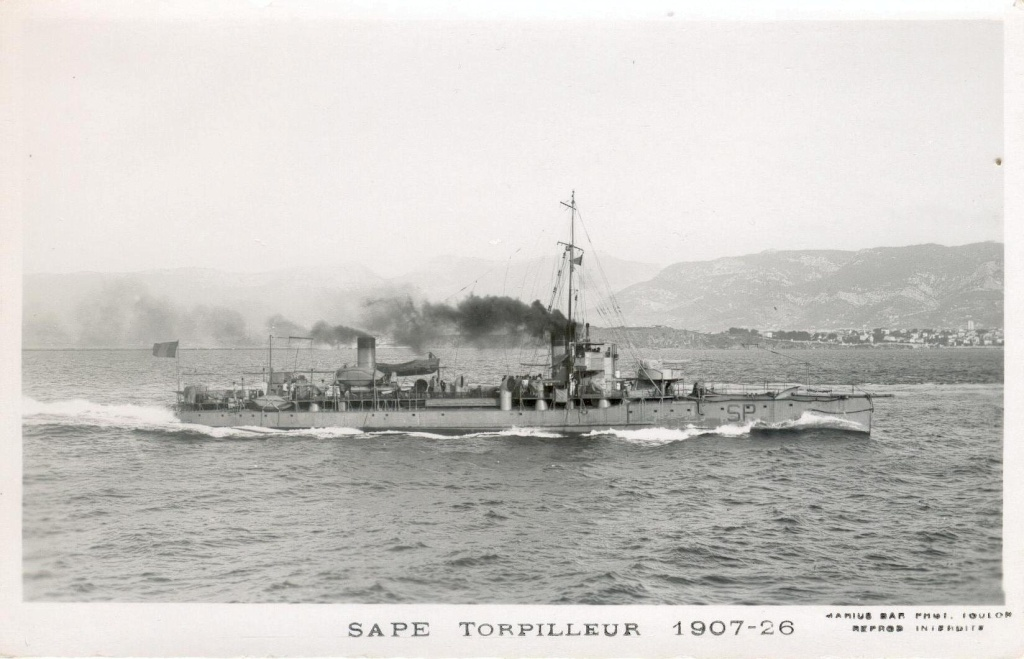
- Sister ship Sape underway

History

France
- Name: Glaive
- Namesake: Glaive
- Builder: Arsenal de Rochefort
- Laid down: May 1905
- Launched: 10 September 1908
- Stricken: 12 February 1932

General characteristics
- Class & type: Branlebas-class destroyer
- Displacement: 350 t (344 long tons)
- Length: 58 m (190 ft 3 in) (p/p)
- Beam: 6.28 m (20 ft 7 in)
- Draft: 2.96 m (9 ft 9 in)
- Installed power: 6,800 ihp (5,071 kW); 2 Normand or Du Temple boilers
- Propulsion: 2 shafts; 2 Triple-expansion steam engines
- Speed: 27.5 knots (50.9 km/h; 31.6 mph)
- Range: 2,100 nmi (3,900 km; 2,400 mi) at 10 knots (19 km/h; 12 mph)
- Complement: 60
- Armament: 1 × 65 mm (2.6 in) gun; 6 × 47 mm (1.9 in) Hotchkiss guns; 2 × 450 mm (17.7 in) torpedo tubes
- Armor: Waterline belt: 20 mm (0.8 in)

Glaive was one of 10 Branlebas-class destroyers built for the French Navy in the first decade of the 20th century.

== Construction and career ==
When the First World War began in August 1914, Glaive was assigned to the 2nd Destroyer Flotilla (2^{e} escadrille de torpilleurs) of the 2nd Light Squadron (2^{e} escadre légère) based at Cherbourg.

== Bibliography ==
- Campbell, N. J. M. (1979). "France". In Chesneau, Roger & Kolesnik, Eugene M. (eds.). Conway's All the World's Fighting Ships 1860–1905. Greenwich: Conway Maritime Press. pp. 283–333. ISBN 0-8317-0302-4.
- Couhat, Jean Labayle (1974). French Warships of World War I. London: Ian Allan. ISBN 0-7110-0445-5.
- Prévoteaux, Gérard (2017). La marine française dans la Grande guerre: les combattants oubliés: Tome I 1914–1915 [The French Navy during the Great War: The Forgotten Combatants, Book I 1914–1915]. Collection Navires & Histoire des Marines du Mond. Vol. 23. Le Vigen, France: Éditions Lela presse. ISBN 978-2-37468-000-2.
- Prévoteaux, Gérard (2017). La marine française dans la Grande guerre: les combattants oubliés: Tome II 1916–1918 [The French Navy during the Great War: The Forgotten Combatants, Book II 1916–1918]. Collection Navires & Histoire des Marines du Mond. Vol. 27. Le Vigen, France: Éditions Lela presse. ISBN 978-2-37468-001-9.
- Roberts, Stephen S. (2021). French Warships in the Age of Steam 1859–1914: Design, Construction, Careers and Fates. Barnsley, UK: Seaforth Publishing. ISBN 978-1-5267-4533-0.
