= Q73 =

Q73 may refer to:

- Q73 (New York City bus)
- Al-Muzzammil, a surah of the Quran
- French submarine Archimède (1909)
