= French submarine Charles Brun =

1906 experimental naval boat

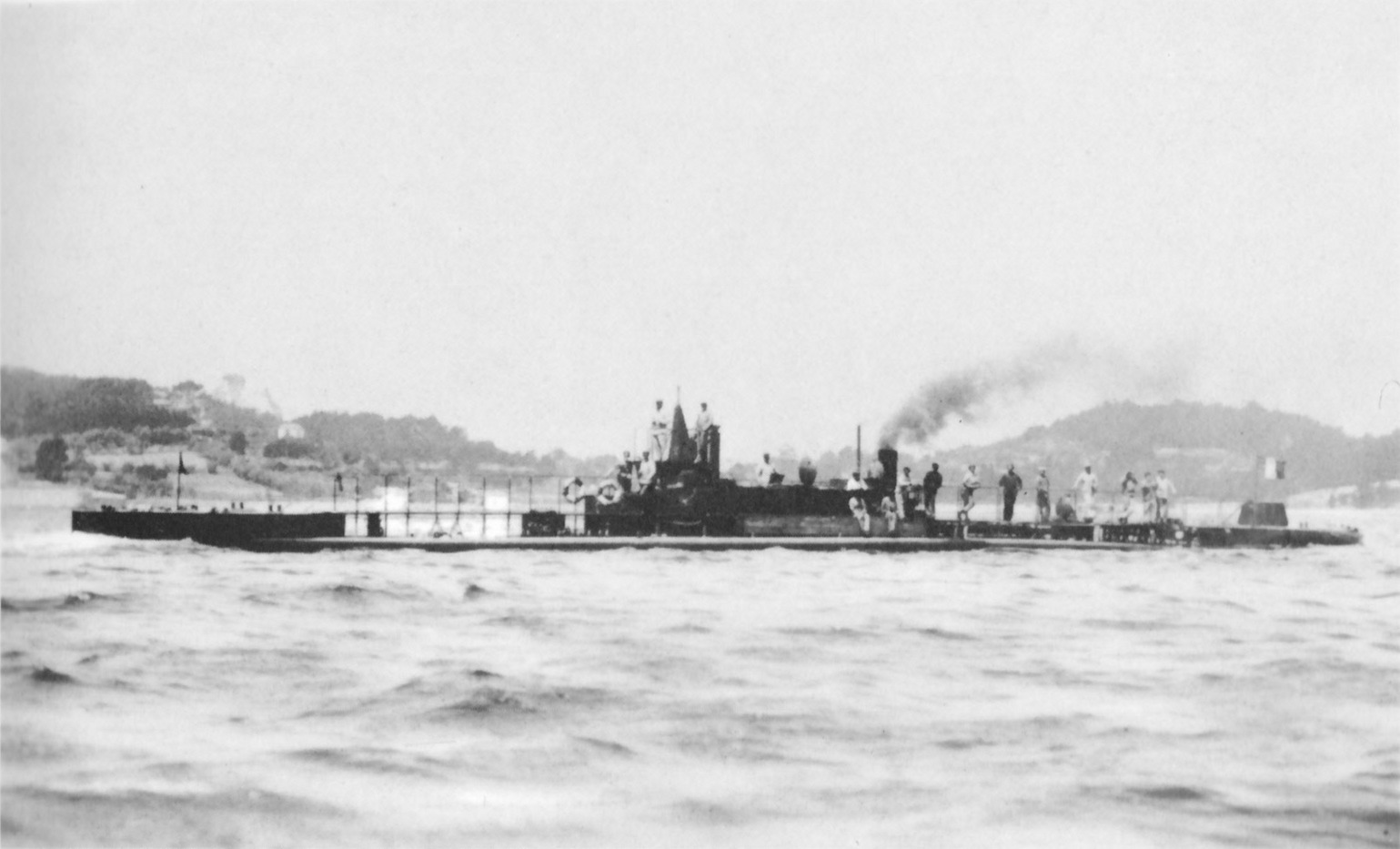
- Charles Brun in Toulon roadstead, 1913

Class overview
- Name: Charles Brun
- Operators: French Navy
- Preceded by: Amiral Bourgois
- Succeeded by: Clorinde class
- Built: 1907–1912
- Completed: 1
- Scrapped: 1

History

France
- Name: Charles Brun
- Namesake: Charles Brun
- Ordered: 31 December 1906
- Builder: Arsenal de Toulon
- Laid down: 4 April 1908
- Launched: 14 September 1910
- Stricken: 7 June 1920
- Fate: Sold for scrap, 30 December 1920

General characteristics (as built)
- Type: Submarine
- Displacement: 360 t (354 long tons) (surfaced); 453 t (446 long tons) (submerged)
- Length: 45.6 m (149 ft 7 in) (o/a)
- Beam: 4 m (13 ft 1 in)
- Draft: 3.6 m (11 ft 10 in)
- Installed power: 4 Maurice boilers; 1,300 PS (956 kW) (steam); 200 PS (147 kW) (electric)
- Propulsion: 2 shafts; 2 triple-expansion steam engines; 2 electric motors
- Speed: 13.5 knots (25.0 km/h; 15.5 mph) (surfaced); 7.25 knots (13.43 km/h; 8.34 mph) (submerged)
- Range: 1,050 nmi (1,940 km; 1,210 mi) at 7 knots (13 km/h; 8.1 mph) (surfaced); 10.7 nmi (19.8 km; 12.3 mi) at 2.8 knots (5.2 km/h; 3.2 mph) (submerged)
- Test depth: 30 m (98 ft 5 in)
- Complement: 25
- Armament: 2 × 450 mm (17.7 in) bow torpedo tubes; 2 × single 450 mm Drzewiecki drop collars; 2 × single external 450 mm torpedo launchers

Charles Brun was one of four experimental submarines ordered for the French Navy in 1906. Each boat was built to a different design and Charles Brun was intended to test a novel powerplant. Although the shore-based prototype installation was successful, it was a failure when evaluated aboard the submarine, and the boat was never commissioned for active service. Her hull was stripped of its equipment and was used to test a floating drydock in 1914. During the First World War, the hull was ordered to be converted into a water tank in 1916, but it is not certain if this was actually done before it was sold for scrap in 1920.

== Background ==
The naval architect and engineer Just Lucien Maurice had submitted multiple submarine designs to the Navy's Board of Construction (Conseil des travaux) using a unique closed-cycle powerplant of his own design. The board rejected the four proposals that he submitted in 1902, believing them to be too high risk and that their submerged range was inadequate. The Navy Minister (Ministre de la Marine), Jean de Lanessan, was intrigued by his concept and ordered that a prototype of his powerplant be built at the Cherbourg Naval Base (Arsenal de Cherbourg) for testing.

Maurice had designed a steam fire-tube boiler that utilized the boiler's combustion gases to heat a mixture of sodium acetate and potassium in the space between the two concentric fire tubes. Once the mixture melted at a temperature of 212 °C (414 °F), it would then heat the water in the boiler and the resulting steam would be fed to a conventional triple-expansion steam engine. When the submarine submerged the mixture would retain heat, continuing to generate steam, until it solidified.

The prototype at Cherbourg was successful enough that Navy Minister Gaston Thomson opened a competition for submarines that were faster on the surface and with longer range than the preceding Pluviôse class on 6 February 1906. Surfaced requirements were for a maximum speed of 15 knots (28 km/h; 17 mph), a range of 1,250 nautical miles (2,320 km; 1,440 mi) without using an auxiliary fuel tank, and a range of 2,500 nmi (4,600 km; 2,900 mi) with the extra fuel. Submerged, the boats had to have a maximum speed of 10 knots (19 km/h; 12 mph) and a range of 100 nmi (190 km; 120 mi) at 5 knots (9.3 km/h; 5.8 mph). Four designs were submitted, including Maurice's for Charles Brun, all of which were authorized by the board.

== Description ==
Charles Brun was significantly smaller than the other designs submitted for the competition with a surfaced displacement of 360 metric tons (354 long tons) and a submerged displacement of 453 t (446 long tons). The boat had an overall length of 45.6 metres (149 ft 7 in), a beam of 4 meters (13 ft 1 in) and a draft of 3.6 m (11 ft 10 in). Her crew numbered 25 officers and sailors. She had a test depth of 30 meters (98 ft) and a metacentric height of 0.432 m (1 ft 5 in) when surfaced. Like most French submarines of this period, Charles Brun was fitted with a prominent "walking deck" above her single hull to facilitate operations on the surface.

The submarine's hull was divided into seven watertight compartments plus the conning tower. The boat had three rudders, two below the waterline and the third above the "walking deck" to improve her submerged maneuverability. She had three sets of diving planes, fore, aft, and amidships, to control her depth below the water. The hull was fitted with a dozen external ballast tanks and three internal tanks, one of which could be used as an auxiliary tank for fuel oil. Normally, Charles Brun had a capacity of 11,440 liters (2,520 imp gal; 3,020 U.S. gal) of oil, plus another 2,000 L (440 imp gal; 530 US gal) that could be stored in the ballast tank.

On the surface, the boat was powered by a pair of three-cylinder triple-expansion steam engines, each driving one propeller shaft using steam provided by two pairs of Maurice boilers that had a working pressure of 30 kg/cm^{2} (2,942 kPa; 427 psi). The engines were designed to develop a total of 1,300 metric horsepower (956 kW) and a maximum speed of 13.5 knots (25.0 km/h; 15.5 mph). Submerged, the steam engines could be supplemented by a pair of 100-metric-horsepower (74 kW) electric motors using electricity from 120 Tudor batteries.

Internally, Charles Brun was armed with two superimposed 45 cm (17.7 in) torpedo tubes in the bow. Externally, the boat was equipped with two rotating Drzewiecki drop collars below the "walking deck" and two fixed launching frames at the stern aimed to the rear.

== Construction, trials and subsequent history ==
Charles Brun, named for the naval architect and politician Charles Brun who had worked on the first French submarine Plongeur, was ordered on 31 December 1906 from the Toulon Naval Base (Arsenal de Toulon). She was laid down on 4 April 1908 and was launched on 14 September 1910 and began her trials the following month. Initial testing of her powerplant was plagued by combustion problems that sent a lot of smoke and flames out the funnels, but these were resolved before the submarine began her sea trials on 1 June 1911. These were initially limited to performance on the surface and quickly revealed that the boilers produced only 1,200 kg (2,600 lb) of steam compared to the prototype's 1,600 kg (3,500 lb) because Maurice had altered the design of the boilers, reducing the amount of the sodium acetate/potassium mixture by over 20 percent and had changed the spacing of the boiler tubes which concentrated their heat in the center of the mixture rather than distributing it evenly throughout. Despite these issues, Charles Brun reached a speed of 13.6 knots (25.2 km/h; 15.7 mph) from 1,098 PS (808 kW) on 21 May 1913 and had a range of 1,050 nmi (1,940 km; 1,210 mi) at 7.15 knots (13.2 km/h; 8.2 mph).

Submerged maneuverability of the boat was evaluated on 12 January 1912 and her turning radius ranged from 280 to 326 m (306 to 357 yd) compared to the 190 m (210 yd) of the Pluviôse class. The submarine made her deepest dive (25 m (82 ft)) on 10 October and operation of the powerplant and her habitability underwater was judged acceptable. Her speed and range while submerged was found to be totally inadequate: she reached a speed of 7.25 knots (13.4 km/h; 8.3 mph), but could only sustain it for 10 minutes, and had a range of 10.7 nmi (19.8 km; 12.3 mi) at 2.8 knots (5.2 km/h; 3.2 mph) versus the requirement for 100 nautical miles. Even using the electric motors, her underwater endurance could not be extended beyond about three hours because the Maurice boilers worked best when used at a high rate in a relatively short period.

The Navy's Test Commission (Commission permanent d'Essais de la Flotte) assessed Charles Brun as unsuitable for active service with the fleet after her trials were concluded in August 1913 and began condemnation proceedings on 20 October after rejecting a proposal to replace the forward boiler with batteries taken from a decommissioned Naïade-class submarine. Beginning in January 1914, her hull was stripped of most of her equipment, her engines were reused in the gunboat Espiègle, and then ballast was added so it could be used in testing floating drydocks. When the First World War began in August, her conversion into a water tank for the naval base in Bizerte, French Tunisia, was proposed, but could not be performed because of stability issues from the earlier work. A contract was issued to Chantiers et Ateliers de Provence on 1 July 1916 to convert the hull into a water tank at their shipyard in Port de Bouc. The hull was there in September, but the conversion was probably not performed because she was listed as a submarine hull when she was finally struck from the navy list on 7 June 1920. The boat was listed for auction on 13 November, but did not sell. It was sold to M. Saglia for 11,000 francs on 30 December and subsequently scrapped.

== See also ==
- List of submarines of France

== Bibliography ==
- Garier, Gérard (1998). Des Émeraude (1905-1906) au Charles Brun (1908–1933) [From Émeraude (1905–1906) to Charles Brun (1908–1933)]. L'odyssée technique et humaine du sous-marin en France (in French). Vol. 2. Bourg-en-Bresse, France: Marines édition. ISBN 2-909675-34-3.
- Roberts, Stephen S. (2021). French Warships in the Age of Steam 1859–1914: Design, Construction, Careers and Fates. Barnsley, UK: Seaforth Publishing. ISBN 978-1-5267-4533-0.
