= Q89 =

Q89 may refer to:

- Q89 (New York City bus)
- Al-Fajr (The Dawn), 89th chapter of the Quran
- French submarine Charles Brun
