= French submarine Amiral Bourgois =

Experimental French Navy vessel

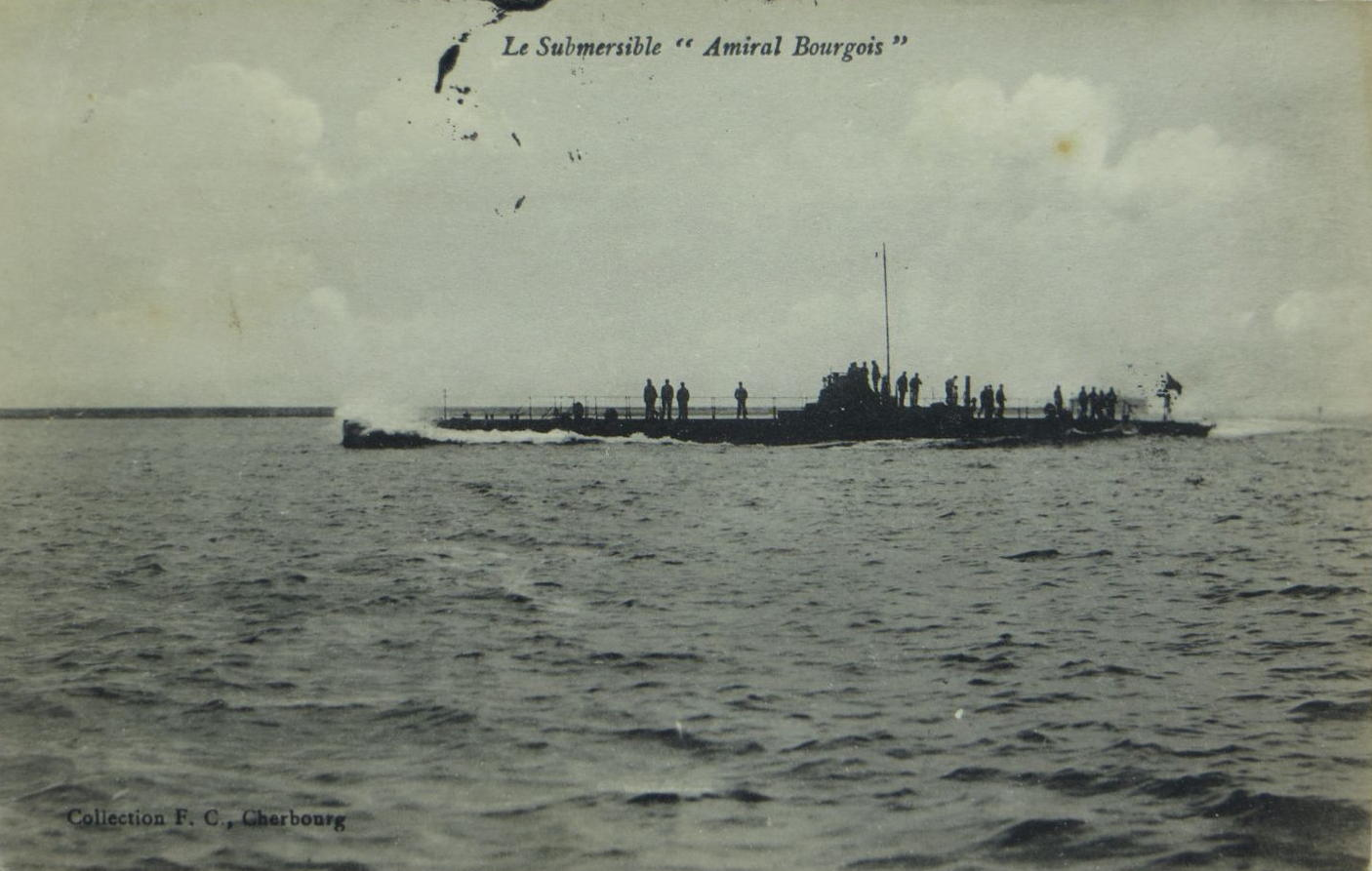
- A postcard of Amiral Bourgois, before 1918

Class overview
- Name: Amiral Bourgois
- Operators: French Navy
- Preceded by: Mariotte
- Succeeded by: Charles Brun
- Built: 1908–1914
- In commission: 1914–1919
- Completed: 1
- Scrapped: 1

History

France
- Name: Amiral Bourgois
- Namesake: Admiral Siméon Bourgois
- Ordered: 31 December 1906
- Builder: Arsenal de Rochefort
- Laid down: 19 May 1908
- Launched: 25 November 1912
- Completed: 1913
- Commissioned: 7 August 1914
- Stricken: 12 November 1919
- Fate: Sold for scrap, 25 June 1927

General characteristics (as built)
- Type: Submarine
- Displacement: 580 t (571 long tons) (surfaced); 746 t (734 long tons) (submerged)
- Length: 56.2 m (184 ft 5 in) (o/a)
- Beam: 5.52 m (18 ft 1 in) (deep)
- Draft: 3.7 m (12 ft 2 in)
- Installed power: 1,400 PS (1,000 kW; 1,400 bhp) (diesels); 1,000 PS (740 kW; 990 bhp) (electric motors)
- Propulsion: 2 × shafts; 2 × diesel engines; 2 × electric motors
- Speed: 13.85 knots (25.7 km/h; 15.9 mph) (surfaced); 8.65 knots (16.02 km/h; 9.95 mph) (submerged)
- Range: 1,500 nmi (2,800 km; 1,700 mi) at 10 knots (19 km/h; 12 mph) (surfaced); 89 nmi (165 km; 102 mi) at 4.2 knots (7.8 km/h; 4.8 mph) (submerged)
- Complement: 29 officers and crewmen
- Armament: 3 × 450 mm (17.7 in) torpedo tubes; 2 × twin 450 mm Drzewiecki drop collars

Amiral Bourgois was one of four experimental submarines ordered for the French Navy in 1906. Each boat was built to a different design and Amiral Bourgois was intended to test a novel powerplant. The experimental diesel engines took over six years to build and greatly delayed the boat's completion until 1913. Although engine problems plagued the submarine throughout her service, she was commissioned shortly after the start of the First World War in 1914, but never made an operational patrol. Amiral Bourgois was under repair when the war ended in 1918, but the work was cancelled shortly afterwards. The boat was struck the following year and offered for sale in 1920. There were no offers and she was used for torpedo testing in 1924–1926. The submarine was sold for scrap in 1927.

== Background and description ==
The Board of Construction (Conseil des travaux) intended to order 20 submarines for the 1906 naval program, including two large long-range experimental boats, one of which was a design by naval constructor Pierre Marc Bourdelle using an unproven Sabathé-cycle diesel engine. The board was preempted by Navy Minister (Ministre de la Marine) Gaston Thomson who opened a competition for submarines that were faster on the surface and with longer range than the preceding Pluviôse class on 6 February 1906. Surfaced requirements were for a maximum speed of 15 knots (28 km/h; 17 mph), a range of 1,250 nautical miles (2,320 km; 1,440 mi) without using an auxiliary fuel tank, and a range of 2,500 nmi (4,600 km; 2,900 mi) with the extra fuel. Submerged, the boats had to have a maximum speed of 10 knots (19 km/h; 12 mph) and a range of 100 nmi (190 km; 120 mi) at 5 knots (9.3 km/h; 5.8 mph). Four designs were submitted, including Bourdelle's Amiral Bourgois, all of which were authorized by the board, along with 16 Brumaire-class submarines.

The submarine was an enlarged version of the twin-hulled Brumaire design with a surfaced displacement of 580 metric tons (570 long tons) and a submerged displacement of 746 t (734 long tons). The boat had an overall length of 56.2 metres (184 ft 5 in), a beam of 5.52 meters (18 ft 1 in) and a draft of 3.7 m (12 ft 2 in). She had a metacentric height of 0.852 m (2 ft 10 in) when surfaced. Her crew numbered three officers and 26 sailors.

The submarine's inner hull was divided into seven watertight compartments. The boat had two rudders, one at the stern and the other below the forward torpedo room. She had three sets of diving planes, fore, aft, and amidships, to control her depth below the water. The boat was fitted with 16 ballast tanks in the space between the inner and outer hulls, plus a single interior tank. Amiral Bourgois carried 15,420 liters (3,390 imp gal; 4,070 U.S. gal) of kerosene.

On the surface, the boat was powered by a pair of four-cylinder Sabathé-cycle diesel engines built by Schneider et Cie, each driving one three-bladed, 1.7 m (5 ft 7 in) propeller. The engines were designed to develop a total of 1,400 metric horsepower (1,000 kW) and a speed of 13.5 knots (25.0 km/h; 15.5 mph). When submerged the propellers were driven by two 500-metric-horsepower (493 shp; 368 kW) electric motors using electricity from two 120-cell batteries. During her sea trials Amiral Bourgois reached 13.85 knots (25.7 km/h; 15.9 mph) from 1,354 PS (996 kW) on the surface and 8.65 knots (16.0 km/h; 10.0 mph) underwater. The boat demonstrated a range of 1,500 nmi (2,800 km; 1,700 mi) at 10 knots (19 km/h; 12 mph), submerged, she had a range of 89 nmi (165 km; 102 mi) at 4.2 knots (7.8 km/h; 4.8 mph).

Internally, Amiral Bourgois was armed with two superimposed 45 cm (17.7 in) torpedo tubes in the bow. Externally, the boat had one tube at the stern and two pairs of rotating Drzewiecki drop collars, one pair each fore and aft of the sail. The submarine was equipped with Modèle 1911V torpedoes. These had a 110-kilogram (240 lb) warhead and a range of 2,000 meters (2,200 yd) at a speed of 36 knots (67 km/h; 41 mph).

== Construction and career ==
Amiral Bourgois, named for the naval architect and admiral, Siméon Bourgois, who had designed the first French submarine Plongeur, was ordered on 31 December 1906 from the Rochefort Naval Base (Arsenal de Rochefort). She was laid down on 19 May 1908 and was launched on 25 November 1912. Her diesels had been ordered on 15 January 1906, but did not arrive until 4 May 1912 and proved very unreliable in service, seriously delaying completion. Sea trials of her electric motors on the surface began on 21 July 1913 and testing of her diesels began on 19 August and lasted through 4 March 1914. The submarine had made a test dive down to a depth of 25 m (82 ft) on 27 February. Underwater testing of her electric motors was conducted on 7–10 July. At some point during her trials a "walking deck" was installed over her outer hull to improve surface operations.

The boat was commissioned on 7 August, shortly after the beginning of the First World War, and was assigned to the 2nd Light Squadron (2^{e} Escadre légère) defending the English Channel. By the time Amiral Bourgois was transferred from Rochefort to Cherbourg a month later, her diesel engines had only run for nine hours. The boat made no operational patrols and did not conduct the endurance trials of her diesels until 17 December 1916. The vice admiral commanding the squadron commented on 11 April 1917 that the submarine was never available for operations and recommended that she be disposed of. Amiral Bourgois struck a rock on the approaches to Brest on 15 May 1917 and a 65-millimetre (2.6 in) deck gun was installed on 10 August. The submarine was transferred to the Normandy submarine squadron in January 1918, but was reassigned to the School of Underwater Navigation at Toulon on 13 May to get her engines repaired. The work was ordered to be stopped on 25 November and she was struck from the navy list on 12 November 1919. Although she was subsequently listed for sale, Amiral Bourgois was taken off the list and reserved for torpedo testing on 21 March 1924. The submarine was sold for scrap at a price of 176,135 francs on 25 June 1927.

== Bibliography ==
- Friedman, Norman (2011). Naval Weapons of World War One: Guns, Torpedoes, Mines and ASW Weapons of All Nations; An Illustrated Directory. Barnsley, UK: Seaforth Publishing. ISBN 978-1-84832-100-7.
- Garier, Gérard (1998). Des Émeraude (1905–1906) au Charles Brun (1908–1933) [From Emeraude (1905–1906) to Charles Brun (1908–1933)]. L'odyssée technique et humaine du sous-marin en France (in French). Vol. 2. Bourg-en-Bresse, France: Marines édition. ISBN 2-909675-34-3.
- Roberts, Stephen S. (2021). French Warships in the Age of Steam 1859–1914: Design, Construction, Careers and Fates. Barnsley, UK: Seaforth Publishing. ISBN 978-1-5267-4533-0.
