= Marie-Joseph-Camille Doré =

French Navy officer

Marie-Joseph-Camille Doré (14 January 1831 – 7 March 1888) was a captain (Lieutenant de Vaisseau) in the French Navy in the 19th century. He was born in La Rochelle in western France on 14 January 1831.

Doré fought in the Crimean War, where, at the age of 24, he received the Légion d'honneur for his actions.

Back in La Rochelle, he was designated to be the captain of the Plongeur, the first submarine in the world to be equipped with mechanical propulsion. He led the experiments in sailing the submarine in 1863–1864.

After this period, Doré left the Navy to become the head of the École navale de la marine marchande (Naval school for commercial shipping), based in Sète on the Mediterranean.

During the Franco-Prussian War, Doré offered to the Marine Ministry to re-commission the Plongeur, but his offer was rejected.
