= Siméon Bourgois =

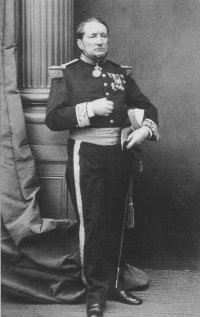

Siméon Bourgois was a 19th-century French Navy vice-admiral who was especially involved in the development of early submarines. He was born in Thionville, Lorraine, on 26 March 1815, and died in Paris on 24 December 1887.

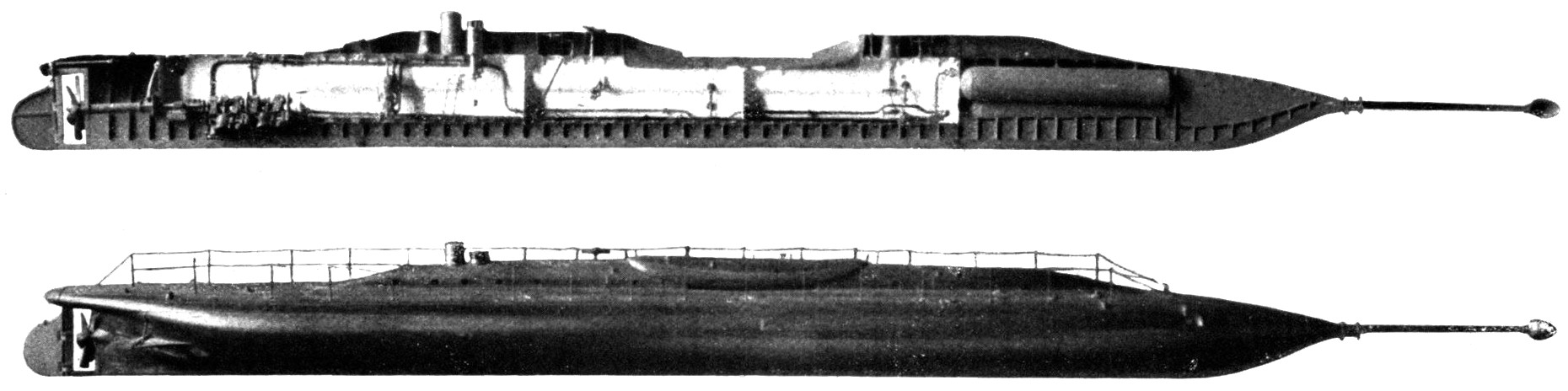
The French submarine Plongeur, 1863.

He held the rank of captain when he presented together with Charles Brun his project for the submarine Plongeur in 1858, and when he created the plans in 1860, under the code name Q00. Plongeur was the world's first submarine to be propelled by mechanical (by opposition to human) power.

He later became a vice-admiral and was influential in the development of the French "Jeune École" ("Young school") school of thought which promoted a modern Navy based on small, powerful units using new technologies. He was a pioneer in the development of the ship screw in France, and became the president of the first Commission for Submarine Defense.

From 1870 to 1872, Siméon Bourgois was Commander of the Naval Division of the Western Coasts of Africa, becoming the Colonial head of Gabon (Colony of Gorée and Dependencies), succeeding to Victor Auguste Duperré at this post. Bourgois launched in 1872 the first program to develop torpedo boats in the French Navy. He posthumously published a book in 1888, Le Torpilleur (The torpedo boat). Among other things, he also wrote in the magazine Nature an article titled De l'effet de l'huile pour calmer l'agitation de la mer (About the effect of oil to calm the agitation of the sea).

A long-range submarine was named in his honour, Amiral Bourgois. This submarine was launched on 25 November 1912. The grandson of Siméon Bourgois, Pierre Bourgois, was a hero of the French Resistance during the Second World War.
