= French destroyer Fanfare =

Destroyer of the French Navy

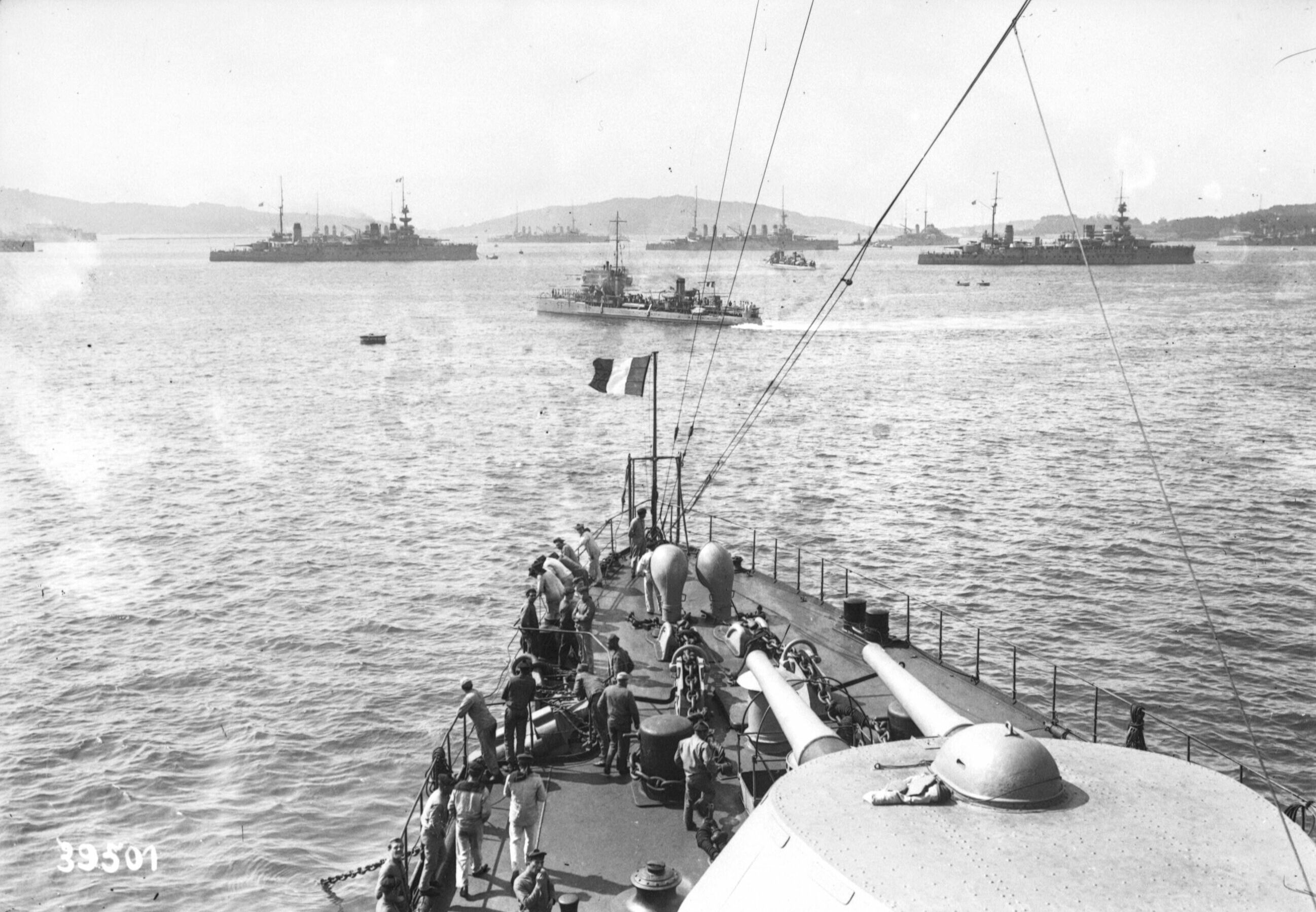
- Fanfare (at the center of the picture), between battleships during an exercise near Toulon in May 1914.

History

France
- Name: Fanfare
- Namesake: Fanfare
- Builder: Chantiers et Ateliers Augustin Normand, Le Havre
- Laid down: November 1905
- Launched: 19 December 1907
- Stricken: 28 September 1925

General characteristics
- Class & type: Branlebas-class destroyer
- Displacement: 350 t (344 long tons)
- Length: 58 m (190 ft 3 in) (p/p)
- Beam: 6.28 m (20 ft 7 in)
- Draft: 2.96 m (9 ft 9 in)
- Installed power: 6,800 ihp (5,071 kW); 2 Normand or Du Temple boilers
- Propulsion: 2 shafts; 2 Triple-expansion steam engines
- Speed: 27.5 knots (50.9 km/h; 31.6 mph)
- Range: 2,100 nmi (3,900 km; 2,400 mi) at 10 knots (19 km/h; 12 mph)
- Complement: 60
- Armament: 1 × 65 mm (2.6 in) gun; 6 × 47 mm (1.9 in) Hotchkiss guns; 2 × 450 mm (17.7 in) torpedo tubes
- Armor: Waterline belt: 20 mm (0.8 in)

Fanfare was one of 10 Branlebas-class destroyers built for the French Navy in the first decade of the 20th century.

== Construction and career ==
When the First World War began in August 1914, Fanfare was assigned to the 5th Destroyer Flotilla (5^{e} escadrille de torpilleurs) of the 1st Naval Army (1^{ère} Armée Navale). During the preliminary stages of the Battle of Antivari on 16 August, the 1st, 4th and 5th Destroyer Flotillas were tasked to escort the core of the 1st Naval Army while the 2nd, 3rd and 6th Flotillas escorted the armored cruisers of the 2nd Light Squadron (2^{e} escadre légère) and two British cruisers. After reuniting both groups and spotting the Austro-Hungarian protected cruiser SMS Zenta and the destroyer SMS Ulan, the French destroyers played no role in sinking the cruiser, although the 4th Flotilla was sent on an unsuccessful pursuit of Ulan. Having broken the Austro-Hungarian blockade of Antivari (now known as Bar), Vice-Admiral (Vice-amiral) Augustin Boué de Lapeyrère, commander of the 1st Naval Army, decided to ferry troops and supplies to the port, escorted by the 2nd Light Squadron and the 1st and 6th Destroyer Flotillas while the rest of the 1st Naval Army bombarded the Austro-Hungarian naval base at Cattaro, Montenegro, on 1 September. Four days later, the fleet covered the evacuation of Danilo, Crown Prince of Montenegro to the Greek island of Corfu. The flotilla escorted multiple small convoys loaded with supplies and equipment to Antivari, beginning in October and lasting for the rest of the year, always covered by the larger ships of the Naval Army in futile attempts to lure the Austro-Hungarian fleet into battle.

By February 1915 Fanfare and her sister ships Poignard and Sabretache had been reunited with the rest of the Fifth Destroyer Flotilla blockading the Dardanelles to prevent a breakout into the Mediterranean by the ex-German battlecruiser Yavuz Sultan Selim and light cruiser Midilli. On 16–17 February Fanfare and Poignard were used to scout out Ottoman fortifications in preparation for a bombardment scheduled for 19 February.

== Bibliography ==
- Campbell, N. J. M. (1979). "France". In Chesneau, Roger & Kolesnik, Eugene M. (eds.). Conway's All the World's Fighting Ships 1860–1905. Greenwich: Conway Maritime Press. pp. 283–333. ISBN 0-8317-0302-4.
- Couhat, Jean Labayle (1974). French Warships of World War I. London: Ian Allan. ISBN 0-7110-0445-5.
- Freivogel, Zvonimir (2019). The Great War in the Adriatic Sea 1914–1918. Zagreb: Despot Infinitus. ISBN 978-953-8218-40-8.
- Jordan, John & Caresse, Philippe (2017). French Battleships of World War One. Annapolis, Maryland: Naval Institute Press. ISBN 978-1-59114-639-1.
- Prévoteaux, Gérard (2017). La marine française dans la Grande guerre: les combattants oubliés: Tome I 1914–1915 [The French Navy during the Great War: The Forgotten Combatants, Book I 1914–1915]. Collection Navires & Histoire des Marines du Mond. Vol. 23. Le Vigen, France: Éditions Lela presse. ISBN 978-2-37468-000-2.
- Prévoteaux, Gérard (2017). La marine française dans la Grande guerre: les combattants oubliés: Tome II 1916–1918 [The French Navy during the Great War: The Forgotten Combatants, Book II 1916–1918]. Collection Navires & Histoire des Marines du Mond. Vol. 27. Le Vigen, France: Éditions Lela presse. ISBN 978-2-37468-001-9.
- Roberts, Stephen S. (2021). French Warships in the Age of Steam 1859–1914: Design, Construction, Careers and Fates. Barnsley, UK: Seaforth Publishing. ISBN 978-1-5267-4533-0.
- Roche, Jean-Michel (2005). Dictionnaire des bâtiments de la flotte de guerre française de Colbert à nos jours [Dictionary of French Warships from Colbert to the Present Day]. Vol. II: 1870–2006. Group Retozel-Maury Millau. ISBN 978-2-9525917-0-6. OCLC 165892922.
