= French submarine Archimède (1909) =

Early 20th century sub

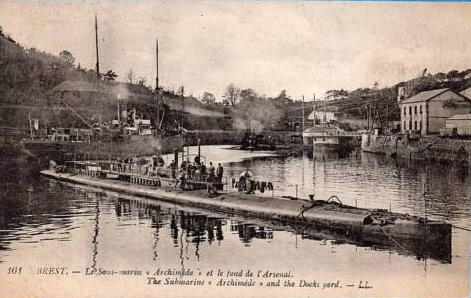
- A postcard of Archimède in Brest, 1910

Class overview
- Name: Archimède
- Operators: French Navy
- Preceded by: Brumaire class
- Succeeded by: Mariotte
- Built: 1908–1910
- In service: 1911–1919
- In commission: 1910–1919
- Completed: 1
- Scrapped: 1

History

France
- Name: Archimède
- Namesake: Archimedes
- Builder: Arsenal de Cherbourg
- Laid down: 2 January 1908
- Launched: 4 August 1909
- Commissioned: 22 September 1910
- In service: September 1911
- Stricken: 12 November 1919
- Fate: Sold for scrap, 4 October 1921

General characteristics (as built)
- Type: Submarine
- Displacement: 580 t (571 long tons) (surfaced); 809 t (796 long tons) (submerged)
- Length: 60.9 m (199 ft 10 in) (o/a)
- Beam: 5.63 m (18 ft 6 in) (deep)
- Draft: 4.51 m (14 ft 10 in)
- Installed power: 840 PS (620 kW; 830 bhp) (diesels); 610 PS (450 kW; 600 bhp) (electric motors)
- Propulsion: 2 × shafts; 2 × diesel engines; 2 × electric motors
- Speed: 14.9 knots (27.6 km/h; 17.1 mph) (surfaced); 11 knots (20 km/h; 13 mph) (submerged)
- Range: 2,910 nmi (5,390 km; 3,350 mi) at 10 knots (19 km/h; 12 mph) (surfaced); 160 nmi (300 km; 180 mi) at 3 knots (5.6 km/h; 3.5 mph) (submerged)
- Complement: 3 officers and 25 crewmen
- Armament: 1 × 450 mm (17.7 in) bow torpedo tube; 2 × single 450 mm Drzewiecki drop collars; 4 × single external 450 mm torpedo launchers

Archimède was one of four experimental submarines ordered for the French Navy in 1906. Each boat was built to a different design and Archimède was optimized to maximize speed and range.

== Background and description ==
The Board of Construction (Conseil des travaux) intended to order 20 submarines for the 1906 naval program, including two large long-range experimental boats. The board was preempted by Navy Minister (Ministre de la Marine) Gaston Thomson who opened a competition for submarines that were faster on the surface and with longer range than the preceding Pluviôse class on 6 February 1906. Surfaced requirements were for a maximum speed of 15 knots (28 km/h; 17 mph), a range of 1,250 nautical miles (2,320 km; 1,440 mi) without using an auxiliary fuel tank, and a range of 2,500 nmi (4,600 km; 2,900 mi) with the extra fuel. Submerged, the boats had to have a maximum speed of 10 knots (19 km/h; 12 mph) and a range of 100 nmi (190 km; 120 mi) at 5 knots (9.3 km/h; 5.8 mph). Four designs were submitted, including one by naval constructor Julien Eugène Hutter using an Pluviôse-type hull enlarged and optimized to meet the speed and range requirements, all of which were authorized by the board, along with 16 Brumaire-class submarines.

Archimède displaced 580 metric tons (570 long tons) surfaced and 809 metric tons (796 long tons) submerged, almost half again more than the Pluviôse-class boats. She had an overall length of 60.9 meters (199 ft 10 in), a beam of 5.63 meters (18 ft 6 in), and a maximum draft of 4.12 meters (13 ft 6 in). The boat had a depth of 8.9 meters (29 ft 2 in) from the bottom of her keel to the top of the conning tower and a metacentric height of 0.211 m (8 in) when surfaced. Like most French submarines of this period, Archimède was fitted with a prominent "walking deck" above her single hull to facilitate operations on the surface.

The submarine's hull was divided into nine watertight compartments. The boat had two rudders at her stern, one below the waterline and the other above. She had three sets of diving planes, fore, aft, and amidships, to control her depth below the water. The hull was fitted with 20 external ballast tanks and 4 internal tanks, 3 of which could be used as auxiliary tanks for fuel oil. Normally, Archimède had a capacity of 28,120 liters (6,190 imp gal; 7,430 U.S. gal) of oil, plus an additional 18,140 L (3,990 imp gal; 4,790 US gal) that could be stored in the ballast tanks.

On the surface, the boat was powered by a pair of three-cylinder triple-expansion steam engines, each driving one three-bladed 1.9-meter (6 ft 3 in) propeller using steam provided by two Guyot du Temple boilers that had a working pressure of 17 kg/cm^{2} (1,667 kPa; 242 psi). The engines were designed to develop a total of 1,688 metric horsepower (1,242 kW) and a maximum speed of 15 knots. Submerged, each propeller was driven by a Breguet 610-metric-horsepower (602 shp; 449 kW) electric motor using electricity from four 62-cell batteries. During her sea trials Archimède briefly reached a speed of 15.2 knots (28.2 km/h; 17.5 mph) on the surface, but had a sustained speed of 14.9 knots (27.6 km/h; 17.1 mph). The boat demonstrated a range of 1,100 nmi (2,000 km; 1,300 mi) at 10 knots (19 km/h; 12 mph), but using her full fuel capacity increased the distance to 2,910 nmi (5,390 km; 3,350 mi) Underwater, she could sustain a speed of 10.95 knots (20.3 km/h; 12.6 mph) and had a range of 99 nmi (183 km; 114 mi) at 5 knots.

Internally, Archimède was armed with a single 45 cm (17.7 in) torpedo tube in the bow. Externally, the boat was equipped with two single rotating Drzewiecki drop collars below the "walking deck" aft of the conning tower, two fixed launching frames abreast the conning tower, aimed 10° off the centerline, and another pair forward of conning tower aimed 6° outwards. The submarine was equipped with Modèle 1906 torpedoes. These had a 110-kilogram (240 lb) warhead and a range of 1,000 meters (1,100 yd) at a speed of 34 knots (63 km/h; 39 mph).

== Construction, trials and subsequent history ==
Archimède was ordered on 31 December 1906 as part of the 1906 competition from the Cherbourg Naval Base (Arsenal de Cherbourg). She was laid down on 2 January 1908 and was launched on 4 August 1909. While exiting the harbor on 24 December, the boat accidentally struck the Cassard a glancing blow while turning. Neither ship was damaged. Engineering problems delayed Archimède's commissioning until September 1911 when she was assigned to the Cherbourg defensive group of submarines. Early the following year, the boat was transferred to the 1st Submarine Flotilla (1^{ère} escadrille de sous-marins) of the Light Squadron (Escadre légère) when those units were formed. On 10 June 1912, the submarine was transferred to the Third Squadron at Brest for offensive missions.

When the First World War began in August 1914, Archimède was assigned to the 3rd Submarine Flotilla of the 2nd Light Squadron at Cherbourg which had the mission of closing the English Channel to German ships and protecting Entente ships in cooperation with the Royal Navy. Archimède and the submarine Mariotte were ordered to Calais on 24 September and placed under British command in preparation for operations in the North Sea. Archimède was transferred to the 2nd Submarine Flotilla on 19 October. At the end of the following month the boat was sent to Harwich, England, and placed under the command of Commodore Roger Keyes. After the British discovered that the German High Seas Fleet had sortied into the North Sea late on 14 December, Keyes ordered eight of his submarines, including Archimède, to set up a patrol line north of the neutral Dutch island of Terschelling no later than the morning of 16 December to defend against any German attempt to enter the English Channel. Archimède was paired with the British submarine E11 and they were stationed at the northern end of the patrol line. If no German ships were spotted, Archimède was to station itself between Heligoland island and the lightship at the mouth of the Weser River and remain on station until the night of the 18th.

== See also ==
- List of submarines of France

== Bibliography ==
- Couhat, Jean Labayle (1974). French Warships of World War I. London: Ian Allan. ISBN 0-7110-0445-5.
- Freivogel, Zvonimir (2019). The Great War in the Adriatic Sea 1914–1918. Zagreb: Despot Infinitus. ISBN 978-953-8218-40-8.
- Friedman, Norman (2011). Naval Weapons of World War One: Guns, Torpedoes, Mines and ASW Weapons of All Nations; An Illustrated Directory. Barnsley, UK: Seaforth Publishing. ISBN 978-1-84832-100-7.
- Garier, Gérard (2002). A l'épreuve de la Grande Guerre [Tested by the Great War]. L'odyssée technique et humaine du sous-marin en France (in French). Vol. 3–2. Bourg-en-Bresse, France: Marines édition. ISBN 2-909675-81-5.
- Garier, Gérard (1998). Des Émeraude (1905-1906) au Charles Brun (1908–1933) [From Émeraude (1905–1906) to Charles Brun (1908–1933)]. L'odyssée technique et humaine du sous-marin en France (in French). Vol. 2. Bourg-en-Bresse, France: Marines édition. ISBN 2-909675-34-3.
- Prévoteaux, Gérard (2017). La marine française dans la Grande guerre: les combattants oubliés: Tome I 1914–1915 [The French Navy during the Great War: The Forgotten Combatants, Book I 1914–1915]. Collection Navires & Histoire des Marines du Mond. Vol. 23. Le Vigen, France: Éditions Lela presse. ISBN 978-2-37468-000-2.
- Prévoteaux, Gérard (2017). La marine française dans la Grande guerre: les combattants oubliés: Tome II 1916–1918 [The French Navy during the Great War: The Forgotten Combatants, Book II 1916–1918]. Collection Navires & Histoire des Marines du Mond. Vol. 27. Le Vigen, France: Éditions Lela presse. ISBN 978-2-37468-001-9.
- Roberts, Stephen S. (2021). French Warships in the Age of Steam 1859–1914: Design, Construction, Careers and Fates. Barnsley, UK: Seaforth Publishing. ISBN 978-1-5267-4533-0.
- Stanglini, Ruggero & Cosentino, Michele (2022). The French Fleet: Ships, Strategy and Operations, 1870-1918. Barnsley, uk. ISBN 978-1-5267-0131-2.
