= French destroyer Branlebas =

Destroyer of the French Navy

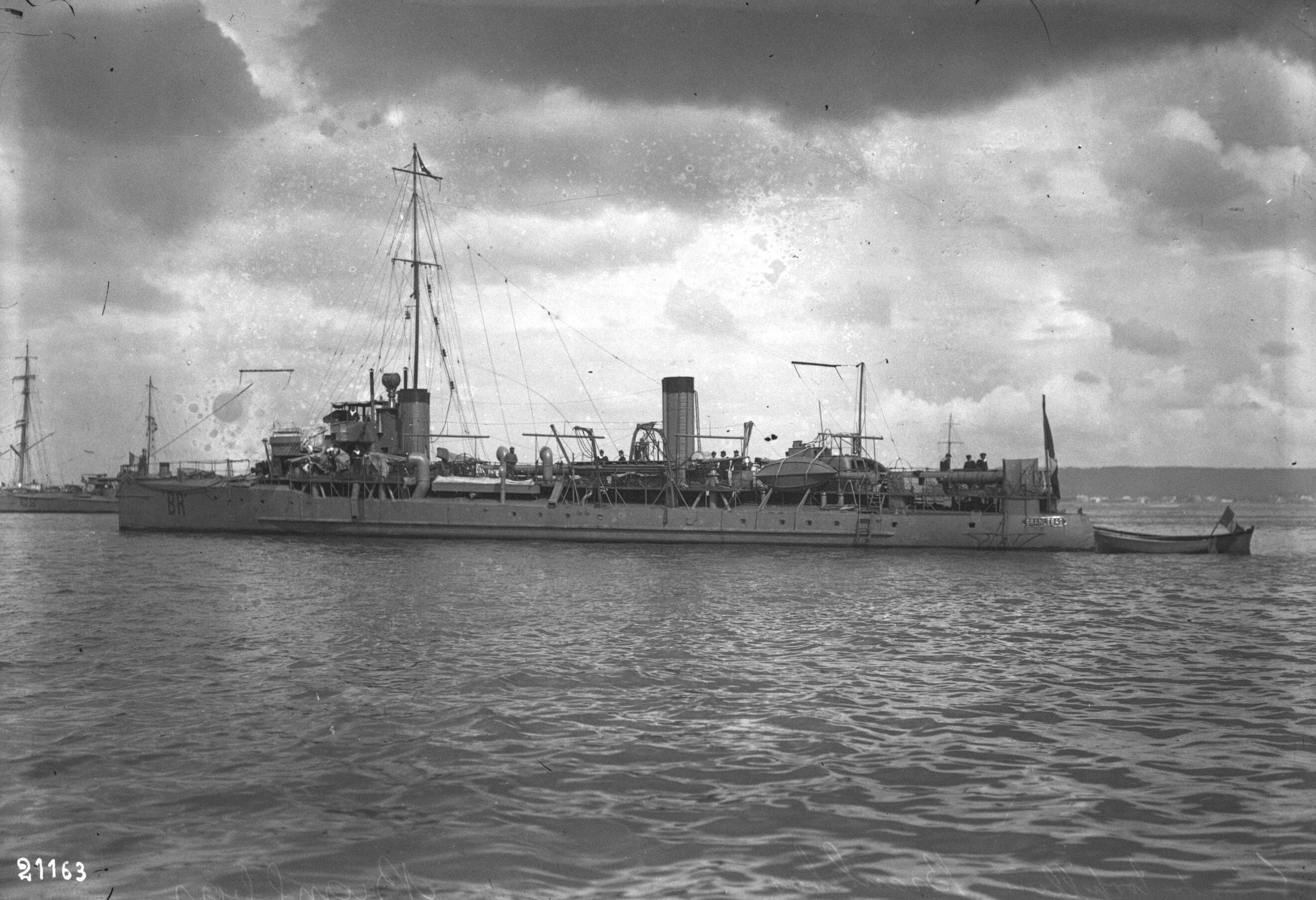
- Branlebas in harbor

History

France
- Name: Branlebas
- Namesake: Action stations
- Builder: Chantiers et Ateliers Augustin Normand, Le Havre
- Laid down: November 1905
- Launched: 8 October 1907
- Fate: Sunk 30 September 1915

General characteristics
- Class & type: Branlebas-class destroyer
- Displacement: 350 t (344 long tons)
- Length: 58 m (190 ft 3 in) (p/p)
- Beam: 6.28 m (20 ft 7 in)
- Draft: 2.96 m (9 ft 9 in)
- Installed power: 6,800 ihp (5,071 kW); 2 Normand or Du Temple boilers
- Propulsion: 2 shafts; 2 Triple-expansion steam engines
- Speed: 27.5 knots (50.9 km/h; 31.6 mph)
- Range: 2,100 nmi (3,900 km; 2,400 mi) at 10 knots (19 km/h; 12 mph)
- Complement: 60
- Armament: 1 × 65 mm (2.6 in) gun; 6 × 47 mm (1.9 in) Hotchkiss guns; 2 × 450 mm (17.7 in) torpedo tubes
- Armor: Waterline belt: 20 mm (0.8 in)

Branlebas was the name ship of her class of destroyers built for the French Navy in the first decade of the 20th century.

During World War I, Branlebas struck a mine and sank in the North Sea between Dunkirk, France, and Nieuwpoort, Belgium, on 30 September 1915.

== Design ==
The Branlebas-class was a development of the previous Claymore class, and was the final evolution of the 300-tonne type which the French had built since 1899, with their first destroyer class, the Durandal-class. Like all the 300-tonne destroyers, the Branlebas class had a turtledeck forecastle with a flying deck, raised above the hull, aft.

They were 58 metres (190 ft 3 in) long between perpendiculars and 59.06 m (193 ft 9 in) overall, with a beam of 6.28 metres (20 ft 7 in) and a maximum draught of 2.37 metres (7 ft 9 in). Displacement was 350 tonnes (344 long tons). Two coal-fired Normand or Du Temple boilers fed steam to two triple-expansion steam engines, rated at 6,800 indicated horsepower (5,100 kW), and driving two propeller shafts, giving a design speed of 27.5 knots (50.9 km/h; 31.6 mph). The ships had a range of 2,100 nautical miles (3,900 km; 2,400 mi) at 10 knots (19 km/h; 12 mph).

A 20 millimetres (0.79 in) belt of armour was fitted to protect the ship's boilers and machinery from splinters. The class was built with the standard gun armament for the 300-tonne destroyers, with a single 65 mm (2.6 in) forward, backed up by six 47 mm (1.9 in) guns, while two 450 mm (17.7 in) torpedo tubes were carried. The ships had a complement of 4 officers and 56 men.

== Construction and service ==
Branlebas was laid down at the Le Havre shipyard of Chantiers et Ateliers A. Normand in November 1905 and was launched on 8 October 1910. She reached a speed of 28.76 kn (33.10 mph; 53.26 km/h) during sea trials.

When the First World War began in August 1914, Branlebas was assigned to the 1st Destroyer Flotilla (1^{re} escadrille de torpilleurs) of the 2nd Light Squadron (2^{e} escadre légère) based at Cherbourg.

== Bibliography ==
- Campbell, N. J. M. (1979). "France". In Chesneau, Roger & Kolesnik, Eugene M. (eds.). Conway's All the World's Fighting Ships 1860–1905. Greenwich: Conway Maritime Press. pp. 283–333. ISBN 0-8317-0302-4.
- Couhat, Jean Labayle (1974). French Warships of World War I. London: Ian Allan. ISBN 0-7110-0445-5.
- Karau, Mark D. (2014). The Naval Flank of the Westorn Front: The German MarineKorps Flandern 1914–1918. Barnsley, UK: Seaforth Publishing. ISBN 978-1-84832-231-8.
- Monograph No. 28: Home Waters Part III.: From November 1914 to the end of January 1915 (PDF). Naval Staff Monographs (Historical). Vol. XII. Naval Staff, Training and Staff Duties Division. 1925.
- Prévoteaux, Gérard (2017). La marine française dans la Grande guerre: les combattants oubliés: Tome I 1914–1915 [The French Navy during the Great War: The Forgotten Combatants, Book I 1914–1915]. Collection Navires & Histoire des Marines du Mond. Vol. 23. Le Vigen, France: Éditions Lela presse. ISBN 978-2-37468-000-2.
- Prévoteaux, Gérard (2017). La marine française dans la Grande guerre: les combattants oubliés: Tome II 1916–1918 [The French Navy during the Great War: The Forgotten Combatants, Book II 1916–1918]. Collection Navires & Histoire des Marines du Mond. Vol. 27. Le Vigen, France: Éditions Lela presse. ISBN 978-2-37468-001-9.
- Roberts, Stephen S. (2021). French Warships in the Age of Steam 1859–1914: Design, Construction, Careers and Fates. Barnsley, UK: Seaforth Publishing. ISBN 978-1-5267-4533-0.
- Viscount Hythe, ed. (1912). The Naval Annual 1912. Portsmouth: J Griffin and Co.
