= Branlebas-class destroyer =

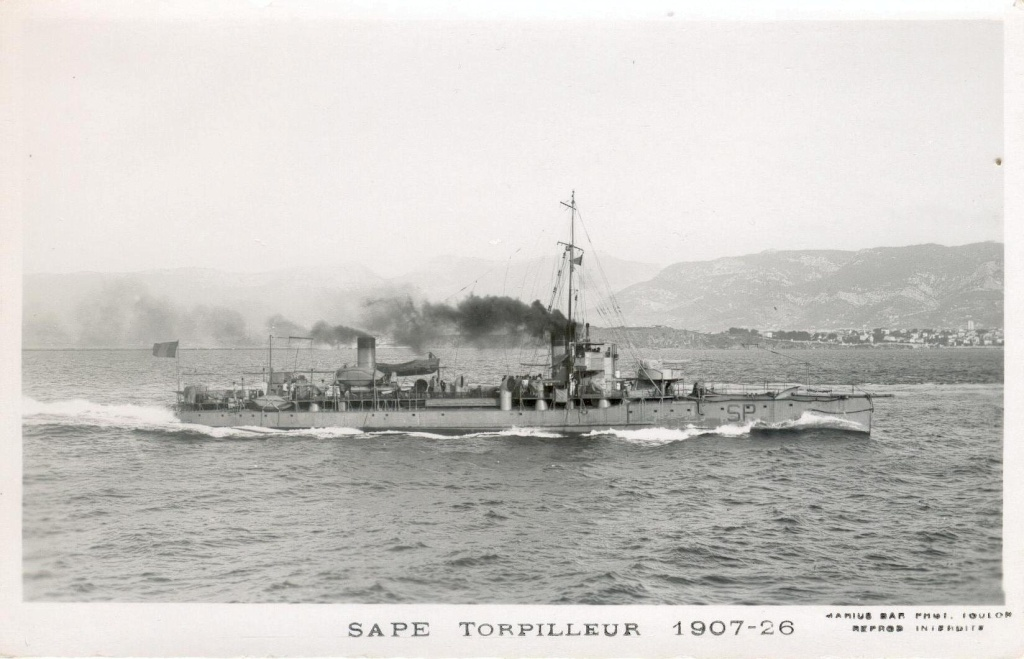
- Sape underway

Class overview
- Name: Branlebas class
- Operators: French Navy
- Preceded by: Claymore class
- Succeeded by: Spahi class
- Built: 1905–09
- In service: 1908–32
- Completed: 10
- Lost: 2
- Scrapped: 8

General characteristics
- Type: Destroyer
- Displacement: 350 t (344 long tons)
- Length: 58 m (190 ft 3 in) (p/p)
- Beam: 6.28 m (20 ft 7 in)
- Draught: 2.96 m (9 ft 9 in)
- Installed power: 6,800 ihp (5,071 kW); 2 Normand or Du Temple boilers
- Propulsion: 2 shafts; 2 triple-expansion steam engines
- Speed: 27.5 knots (50.9 km/h; 31.6 mph)
- Range: 2,100 nmi (3,900 km; 2,400 mi) at 10 knots (19 km/h; 12 mph)
- Complement: 60
- Armament: 1 × 65 mm (2.6 in) gun; 6 × 47 mm (1.9 in) guns; 2 × 450 mm (17.7 in) torpedo tubes
- Armour: Waterline belt: 20 mm (0.8 in)

The Branlebas class (Note: Also known as the Sabretache-class) was a class of ten destroyers built for the French Navy in the first decade of the 20th century. Eight of the ships survived the First World War and were scrapped afterwards.

== Construction and design ==
The Branlebas-class was a development of the previous Claymore-class destroyer, and was the final evolution of the 300-tonne type which the French had built since 1899 with their first destroyer class, the Durandal class. Like all the 300-tonne destroyers, the Branlebas-class ships had a turtledeck forecastle with a flying deck, raised above the hull, aft.

They were 58 metres (190 ft 3 in) long between perpendiculars, with a beam of 6.28 metres (20 ft 7 in) and a maximum draught of 2.96 metres (9 ft 9 in). Displacement was 350 tonnes (344 long tons). Two coal-fired Normand or Du Temple boilers fed steam at 1,830 kilopascals (265 psi) to two 3-cylinder triple-expansion steam engines, rated at 6,800 indicated horsepower (5,100 kW), and driving two propeller shafts, giving a design speed of 27.5 knots (50.9 km/h; 31.6 mph). Speeds reached during sea trials ranged from 27.09 knots (50.17 km/h; 31.17 mph) for Glaive to 29.82 knots (55.23 km/h; 34.32 mph) for Sape. The ships had a range of 2,100 nautical miles (3,900 km; 2,400 mi) at 10 knots (19 km/h; 12 mph).

A 20-millimetre (0.8 in) belt of armour was fitted to protect the ship's boilers and machinery. The class was built with the standard gun armament for the 300-tonne destroyers, with a single 65 mm (2.6 in) forward, backed up by six 47 mm (1.9 in) guns, while two 450 mm (17.7 in) torpedo tubes were carried, with one amidships and one right aft. The ships had a complement of 4 officers and 56 men.

The Branlebas class were considered good sea-boats, with reliable machinery. By the time the class was built, however, they were outclassed by contemporary British and German destroyers, such as the River-class and the German S138-class torpedo boat being larger (and more heavily armed. (French destroyer size had been kept small owing to the influence of the Jeune École, which favoured the construction of large numbers of small ships.)

== Losses ==
- Branlebas was sunk by a German mine on 30 September 1915 near Nieuwpoort, Belgium.
- Étendard was sunk by German torpedoboat A39 on 25 April 1917 in the North Sea.

== Ships ==
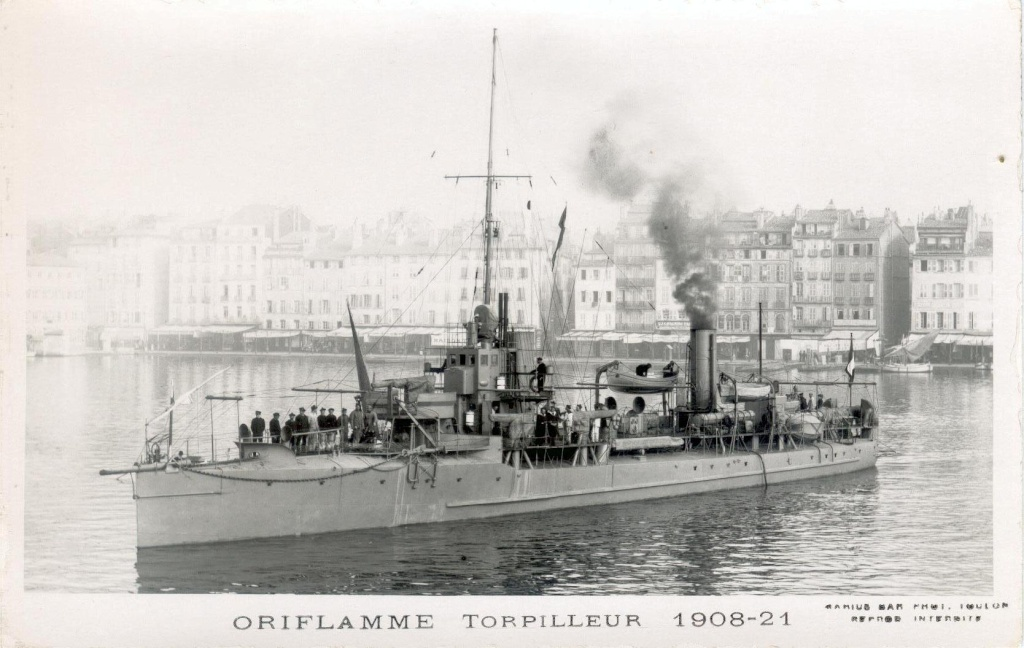
A postcard of Oriflamme

Ship	Builder	Laid down	Launched	Fate
Branlebas (Note: Roche gives the name as Branle-bas)	Normand	November 1905	8 October 1907	Sunk by mine 30 September 1915
Étendard	Dyle et Bacalan, Bordeaux	December 1905	20 March 1908	Sank 25 April 1917
Fanfare	Normand	November 1905	12 December 1907	Stricken 29 September 1925
Fanion	Dyle et Bacalan, Bordeaux	December 1905	4 May 1908	Stricken 27 May 1925
Gabion	Chantiers de Penhoët, Rouen	November 1905	21 December 1907	Stricken 14 May 1921
Glaive	Rochefort Dockyard	May 1905	10 September 1908	Stricken 13 February 1932
Oriflamme	De La Brosse et Fouché, Nantes	June 1906	4 April 1908	Stricken 27 May 1921
Poignard	Rochefort Dockyard	May 1905	3 July 1909	Stricken 3 May 1926
Sabretache (Note: Couhat gives the name as Sabretagne.)	De La Brosse et Fouché, Nantes	June 1906	5 February 1908	Stricken 10 May 1920
Sape	Chantiers de Penhoët, Rouen	November 1905	23 September 1908	Stricken 3 May 1926

== Bibliography ==
- Campbell, N. J. M. (1979). "France". In Chesneau, Roger & Kolesnik, Eugene M. (eds.). Conway's All the World's Fighting Ships 1860–1905. Greenwich: Conway Maritime Press. pp. 283–333. ISBN 0-8317-0302-4.
- Couhat, Jean Labayle (1974). French Warships of World War I. London: Ian Allan. ISBN 0-7110-0445-5.
- "Recent French Torpedo boat Destroyers" (PDF). The Engineer. 21 August 1908. pp. 191–192.
- Jordan, John (2025). "The 300-Tonnes: The First French Torpedo Boat Destroyer". In Jordan, John (ed.). Warship 2025. London: Bloomsbury Publishing. pp. 111–132. ISBN 978-1-4728-6854-1.
- Prévoteaux, Gérard (2017). La marine française dans la Grande guerre: les combattants oubliés: Tome I 1914–1915 [The French Navy during the Great War: The Forgotten Combatants, Book I 1914–1915]. Collection Navires & Histoire des Marines du Mond. Vol. 23. Le Vigen, France: Éditions Lela presse. ISBN 978-2-37468-000-2.
- Prévoteaux, Gérard (2017). La marine française dans la Grande guerre: les combattants oubliés: Tome II 1916–1918 [The French Navy during the Great War: The Forgotten Combatants, Book II 1916–1918]. Collection Navires & Histoire des Marines du Mond. Vol. 27. Le Vigen, France: Éditions Lela presse. ISBN 978-2-37468-001-9.
- Roberts, Stephen S. (2021). French Warships in the Age of Steam 1859–1914: Design, Construction, Careers and Fates. Barnsley, UK: Seaforth Publishing. ISBN 978-1-5267-4533-0.
