= Charles Brun (France) =

French politician (1821–1897)

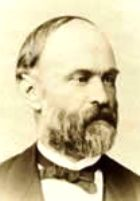

Charles Brun (22 November 1821, Toulon – 13 January 1897, Paris) was a 1st class engineer of the French Navy stationed at Rochefort, France.

He was famously involved in building the submarine Plongeur, which had been designed by Simon Bourgeois, in 1862.

Charles Brun later became:

- Director of Naval constructions
- Member of Parliament for Var (1871–76)
- Senator for Var (1876–89)
- Minister of Marine and the Colonies from 1883
