= French submarine Plongeur =

1863 French submarine, first to be propelled by mechanized power

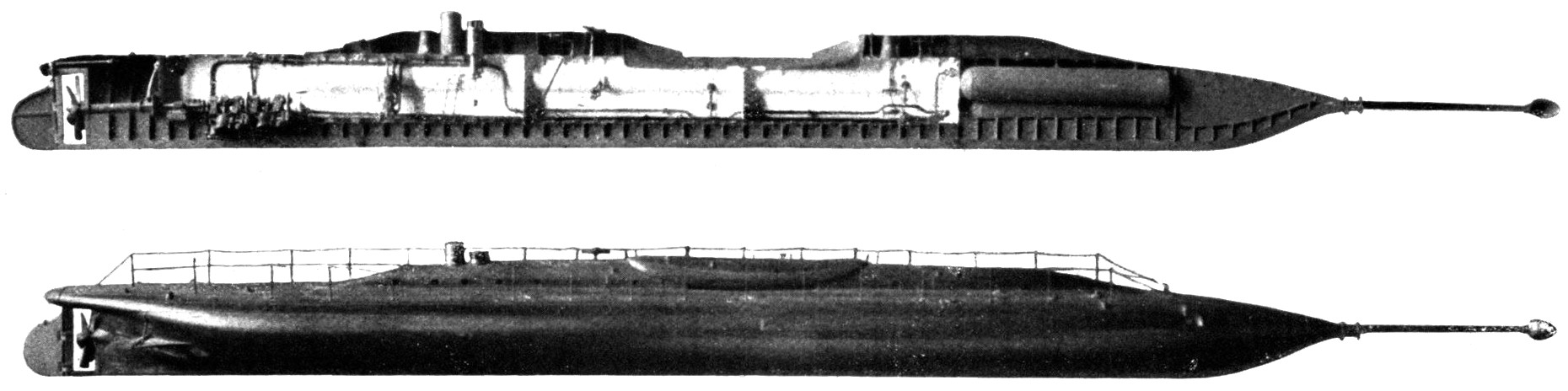
- The French submarine Plongeur, 1863

History

France
- Operator: French Navy
- Ordered: 1859
- Builder: Arsenal de Rochefort
- Laid down: 1 June 1860
- Launched: 16 April 1863
- Stricken: 2 February 1872

General characteristics
- Displacement: 381 t (420 tons) in displacement
- Length: 45 m (146 ft)
- Beam: 3.7 m (12 ft)
- Propulsion: Compressed air engine with 153 m^{3} (5,403 ft^{3}) of compressed air at 12.5 bar (1.25 MPa, 180 psi).
- Speed: 4 kn (7.2 km/h)
- Range: 5 nmi (9 km)
- Test depth: 10 metres
- Complement: 12
- Armament: Spar torpedo

Plongeur (French: [plɔ̃ʒœʁ]; lit. 'Diver') was a French submarine launched on 16 April 1863. She was the first submarine in the world to be propelled by mechanized (rather than human) power.

Captain Siméon Bourgeois, who made the plans, and naval constructor Charles Brun began working on the design in 1859 at Rochefort.

== Design ==
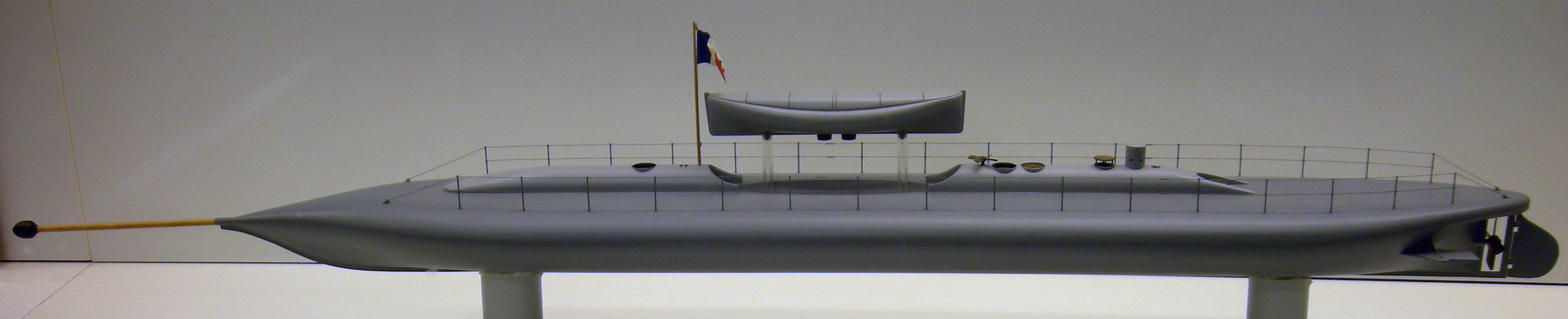
Model of Plongeur at the Deutsches Museum, Munich, showing the lifeboat detached

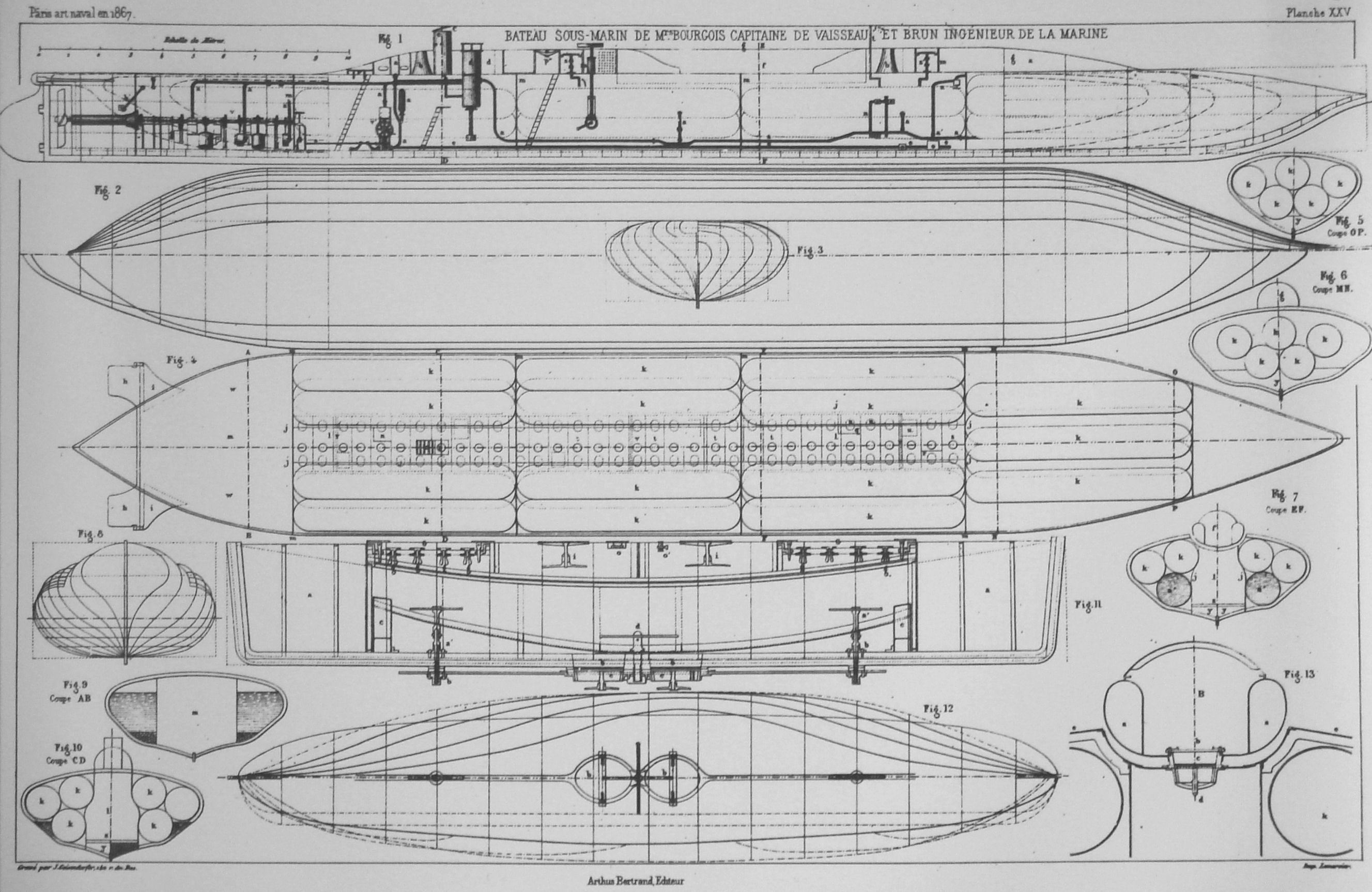
Drawings for Plongeur

In 1859 the Board of Construction (Conseil des travaux) called naval engineers for designs for a submarine and reviewed three proposals, choosing the design submitted by Siméon Bourgeois (later Admiral) and Charles Brun, naming the project Plongeur with the code name Q00.

The submarine used a compressed-air engine, propelled by stored compressed air powering a reciprocating engine. The air was contained in 23 tanks holding air at 12.5 bar (1.25 MPa, 180 psi), taking up significant internal space (153 m³/5,403 ft³), which required the submarine to be unusually large. The engine had a power of 60 kW (80 hp), and could propel the submarine for 5 nmi (9 km), at a speed of 4 kn (7.2 km/h).

Compressed air was also used to empty its ballast tanks, which had a volume of 53 m^{3} (1,872 ft^{3}). Ballast was 212 t (234 tons), including a security ballast of 34 t (37 tons).

The submarine was armed with a ram to break holes in the hull of enemy ships, and an electrically fired spar torpedo, fixed at the end of a pole, though later Admiral Bourgeois (who was, after 1871, chairman of the Commission on Submarine Defenses) opposed the use of torpedoes as the primary weapon in commerce warfare.

The submarine was 43 m (140 ft) long and 381 t (420 tons) in displacement.

A support ship, the Cachalot, followed her in order to resupply the compressed air necessary to her propulsion.

A small lifeboat (8 × 1.7 m; 26 × 5.6 ft) was provided for the escape of the 12-man complement.

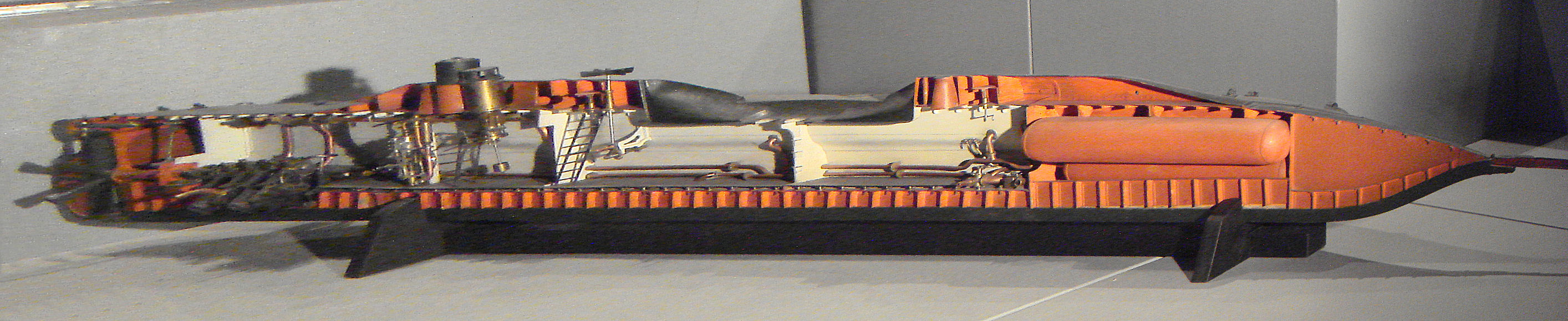
Internal construction of Le Plongeur.

== Operational history ==
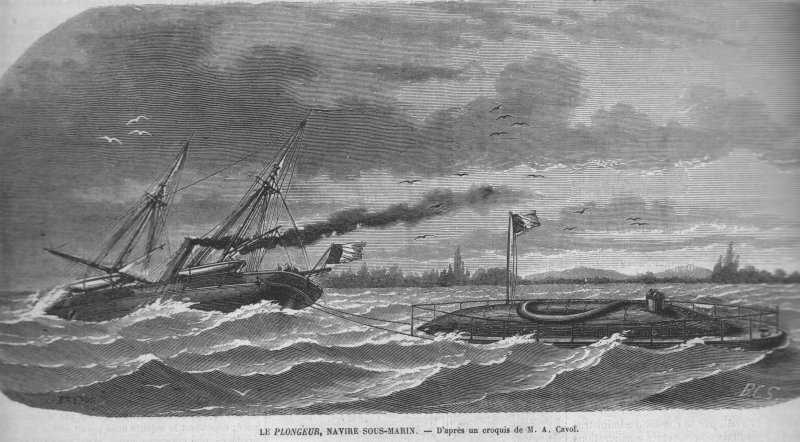
Plongeur under tow by La Vigie.

The submarine was commanded by Lieutenant de Vaisseau Marie-Joseph-Camille Doré.

On 6 October 1863, Plongeur made her first trials by sailing down the Charente River, to the harbour of the Cabane Carrée.

On 2 November 1863, Plongeur was towed to Port-des-Barques, where her first underwater trials were planned. Because of poor weather conditions, the submarine was eventually towed to La Pallice and then to the harbour (Bassin à flot) of La Rochelle.

On 14 February 1864, during trials in the Bassin à flot, the engine raced due to an excessive admission of compressed air, and the submarine bumped into the quay. Trials were stopped.

On 18 February 1864, Plongeur was towed to La Pallice and dived to 9 m (30 ft).

Stability problems due to its length limited the submarine to dives to a maximum depth of 10 m (33 ft). The front of the submarine would tend to dive first, hitting the bottom, so that the submarine would glide forward. Pumps were installed to compensate for the tilt, but proved too slow to be effective. The installation of longitudinal rudders would have improved stability as later demonstrated by the submarines Gymnote and Gustave Zédé.

A model of Plongeur was displayed at the 1867 Exposition Universelle, where it was studied by Jules Verne, who used it as an inspiration for his novel Twenty Thousand Leagues Under the Seas.

After various experiments, she was stricken from the French Navy register on 2 February 1872.

== Conversion ==
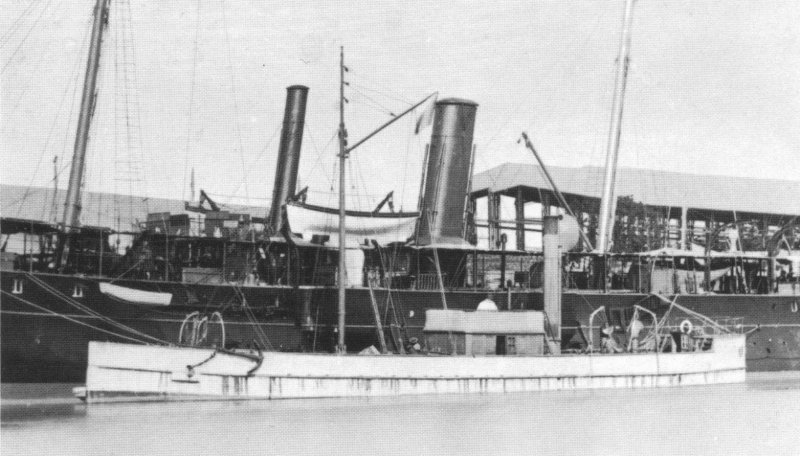
Plongeur in use as a water tanker in the early 20th century.

The submarine was used as a water tanker from 1 January 1873. She was assigned to the harbour of Rochefort. In 1927, upon the closure of the arsenal at Rochefort, she was transferred to the Mediterranean at Toulon. She was decommissioned on 25 December 1935, and sold on 26 May 1937.

== See also ==
- Resurgam

== Bibliography ==
- Garier, Gérard (1995). L'odyssée technique et humaine du sous-marin en France [The Technical and Human Odyssey of the Submarine in France: From Plongeur (1863) to Guêpe (1904)] (in French). Vol. 1: Du Plongeur (1863) aux Guêpe (1904). Bourg-en-Bresse, France: Marines édition. ISBN 2-909675-19-X.
- Jones, Colin (1996). "Entente Cordiale, 1865". In McLean, David & Preston, Antony (eds.). Warship 1996. London: Conway Maritime Press. ISBN 0-85177-685-X.
- Roberts, Stephen S. (2021). French Warships in the Age of Steam 1859–1914: Design, Construction, Careers and Fates. Barnsley, UK: Seaforth Publishing. ISBN 978-1-5267-4533-0.
