= List of destroyers of France =

The following is a list of destroyers of France. In naval terminology, a destroyer is a fast and maneuverable yet long-endurance warship intended to escort larger vessels in a fleet, convoy or battle group and defend them against smaller, powerful, short-range attackers. The Fantasque was the fastest destroyer class ever built.

== Pre-World War I ==
- Takou (1900)

== World War I ==
- Durandal class (1899) — 4 ships
  - Durandal (M1)
  - Hallebarde (M'1)
  - Fauconneau (M'2)
  - Espingole (M'3)
- Framée class (1899) — 4 ships
  - Pique (M'4)
  - Épée (M'5)
  - Framée (M'6)
  - Yatagan (M'7)
- Rochefortais or Pertuisane class (1900) — 4 ships
  - Pertuisane (M'8)
  - Escopette (M'9)
  - Flamberge (M'10)
  - Rapière (M'11)
- Arquebuse class (1902) — 20 ships
  - Carabine (M'12)
  - Sarbacane (M'13)
  - Arquebuse (M'14)
  - Arbalète (M'15)
  - Mousquet (M'16)
  - Javeline (M'17)
  - Sagaie (M'18)
  - Épieu (M'19)
  - Harpon (M'20)
  - Fronde (M'21)
  - Francisque (M'22)
  - Sabre (M'23)
  - Dard (M'24)
  - Baliste (M'25)
  - Mousqueton (M'26)
  - Arc (M'27)
  - Pistolet (M'28)
  - Bélier (M'29)
  - Catapulte (M'30)
  - Bombarde (M'31)
- Claymore class (1905) — 13 ships
  - Stylet (M'32)
  - Tromblon (M'33)
  - Pierrer (M'34)
  - Obusier (M'35)
  - Mortier (M'36)
  - Claymore (M'37)
  - Carquois (M'38)
  - Trident (M'39)
  - Fleuret (M'40)
  - Coutelas (M'41)
  - Cognée (M44)
  - Hache (M45)
  - Massue (M46)
- Branlebas class (1907) — 10 ships
  - Glaive (M'42)
  - Poignard (M'43)
  - Sabretache (M47)
  - Oriflamme (M48)
  - Étendard (M49)
  - Fanion (M50)
  - Sape (M51)
  - Gabion (M52)
  - Branlebas (M53)
  - Fanfare (M54)
- Spahi class (1908) — 7 ships
  - Spahi (M55)
  - Hussard (M59)
  - Carabinier (M60)
  - Lansquenet (M61)
  - Mameluck (M62)
  - Enseigne Henry (M84)
  - Aspirant Herber (M85)
- Voltigeur class (1908) — 2 ships
  - Voltigeur (M56)
  - Tirailleur (M57)
- Chasseur class (1909) — 4 ships
  - Chasseur (M58)
  - Actée — sold to Peru as BAP Teniente Rodríguez before completion
  - Janissaire (M63)
  - Fantassin (M64)
  - Cavalier (M65)
- Bouclier class (1911) — 12 ships
  - Cimeterre (M66)
  - Dague (M67)
  - Fourche (M68)
  - Faulx (M69)
  - Boutefeu (M70)
  - Bouclier (M71)
  - Casque (M72)
  - Capitaine Mehl (M73)
  - Dehorter (M74)
  - Francis Garnier (M75)
  - Commandant Bory (M76)
  - Commandant Rivière (M77)
- Bisson class (1912) — 6 ships
  - Commandant Lucas (M78)
  - Magon (M79)
  - Mangini (M80)
  - Bisson (M81)
  - Renaudin (M82)
  - Protet (M83)
- Aventurier class (1914) — 4 ships
  - Opiniâtre
  - Aventurier
  - Téméraire
  - Intrépide
- Enseigne Roux class (1915) — 3 ships
  - Mécanicien Principal Lestin (M86)
  - Enseigne Roux (M87)
  - Enseigne Gabolde (M88) — completed to a modified design
- M89 class (1915) — 2 ships, Cancelled
  - M89
  - M90
- Arabe class (1917) — 12 ships
  - Algérien
  - Annamite
  - Arabe
  - Bambara
  - Hova
  - Kabyle
  - Marocain
  - Sakalave
  - Sénégalais
  - Somali
  - Tonkinois
  - Touareg

== Between the World Wars ==
- Lion class — 2 ships, Cancelled
  - Lion
  - Guépard

== World War II ==
- Chacal class — 6 ships
  - Chacal
  - Jaguar
  - Léopard
  - Lynx
  - Panthère
  - Tigre
- Guépard class — 6 ships
  - Bison
  - Guépard
  - Lion
  - Valmy
  - Verdun
  - Vauban
- Aigle class — 6 ships
  - Aigle
  - Vautour
  - Albatros
  - Gerfaut
  - Milan
  - Épervier
- Vauquelin class — 6 ships
  - Cassard
  - Chevalier Paul
  - Kersaint
  - Maillé Brézé
  - Tartu
  - Vauquelin
- Fantasque class — 6 ships
  - Le Fantasque
  - Le Malin
  - Le Terrible
  - L'Indomptable
  - L'Audacieux
  - Le Triomphant
- Mogador class — 2 ships
  - Mogador
  - Volta
- Bourrasque class — 12 ships
  - Bourrasque
  - Cyclone
  - Mistral
  - Orage
  - Ouragan
  - Simoun
  - Siroco
  - Tempête
  - Tornade
  - Tramontane
  - Trombe
  - Typhon
- Adroit class — 14 ships
  - L'Adroit
  - Basque
  - Bordelais
  - Boulonnais
  - Brestois
  - Forbin
  - Frondeur
  - L'Alcyon
  - La Palme
  - La Railleuse
  - Le Fortuné
  - Le Mars
  - Foudroyant
  - Fougueux
- Hardi class — 8 ships
  - Le Hardi
  - Fleuret
  - Épée
  - Mameluk
  - Casque
  - Le Flibustier
  - Lansquenet
  - Siroco

== Post-war ==
- T 47 class — all 12 units retired in the 1980s.
  - Surcouf
  - Kersaint
  - Cassard
  - Bouvet
  - Dupetit-Thouars
  - Chevalier Paul
  - Maillé-Brézé
  - Vauquelin
  - D'Estrées
  - Du Chayla
  - Casabianca
  - Guépratte
- T 53 class — all 6 units retired in the 1970s & 1980s.
  - Duperré
  - La Bourdonnais
  - Forbin
  - Tartu
  - Jauréguiberry
  - La Galissonnière
- Aconit class — 1 ship, decommissioned in 1996

== See also ==
- Escorteur
