= Kaba-class destroyer =

1915 class of Japanese destroyers

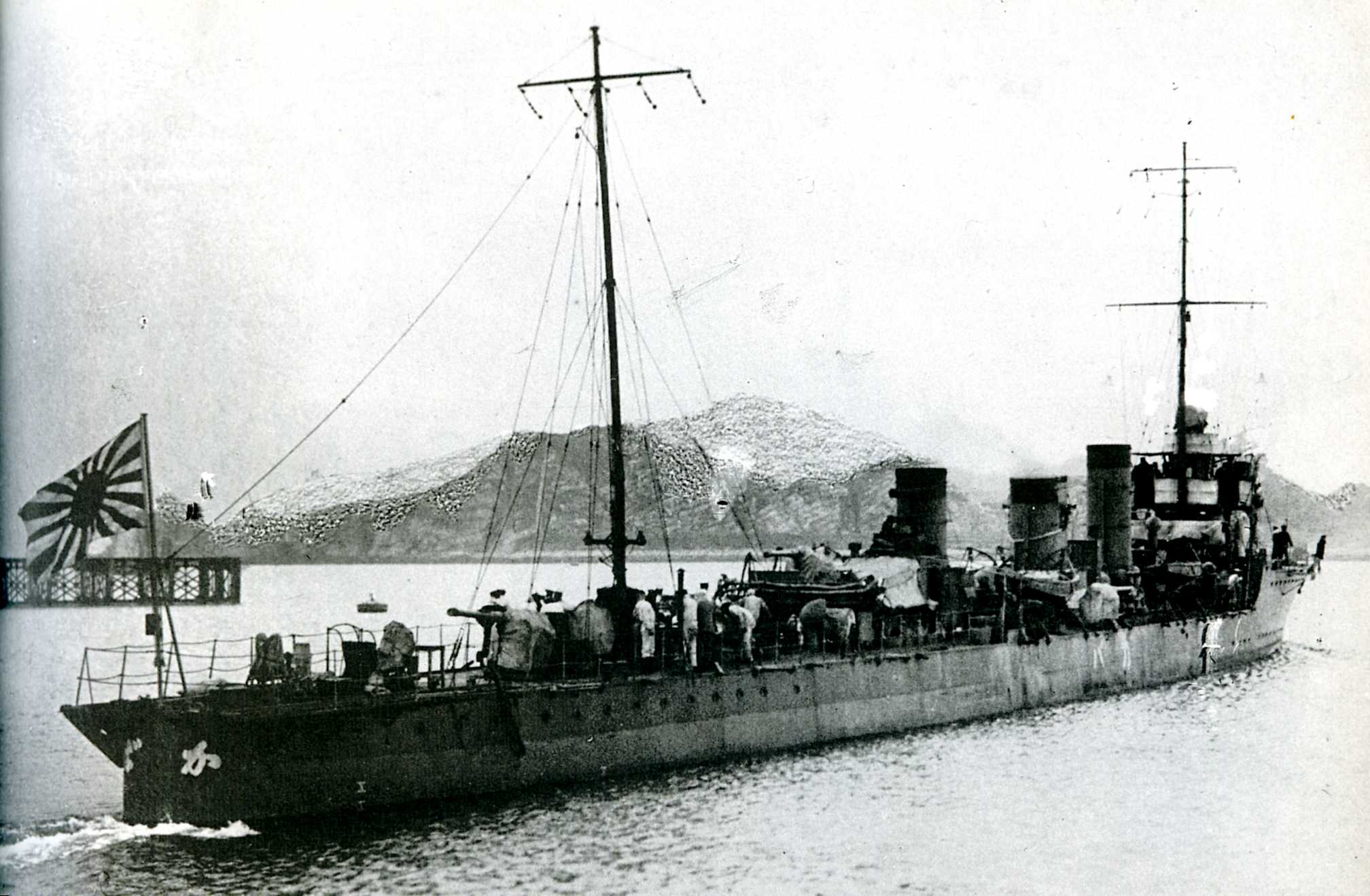
- Kaba departing Ryojun, 1925

Class overview
- Name: Kaba class
- Builders: Mitsubishi Shipyards (2); Kawasaki Dockyard Co. (2); Kure Naval Arsenal (1); Maizuru Naval Arsenal (1); Osaka Iron Works (1); Sasebo Naval Arsenal (1); Uraga Dock Company (1); Yokosuka Naval Arsenal (1)
- Operators: Imperial Japanese Navy
- Preceded by: Urakaze class
- Succeeded by: Isokaze class
- Subclasses: Arabe class (French Navy)
- In commission: 1915–1932
- Completed: 10
- Retired: 10

General characteristics
- Type: Destroyer
- Displacement: 655 long tons (666 t) (normal); 810 long tons (820 t) (full load)
- Length: 260 ft (79.2 m) (pp); 274 ft (83.5 m) (o/a)
- Beam: 24 ft (7.3 m)
- Draught: 7 ft 9 in (2.4 m)
- Installed power: 4 water-tube boilers; 9,500 ihp (7,100 kW)
- Propulsion: 3 shafts; 3 triple-expansion steam engines
- Speed: 30 knots (56 km/h; 35 mph)
- Range: 1,600 nmi (3,000 km; 1,800 mi) at 15 knots (28 km/h; 17 mph)
- Complement: 92
- Armament: 1 × single 12 cm (4.7 in) gun; 4 × single 3 in (76 mm) guns; 2 × twin 450 mm (17.7 in) torpedo tubes

The Kaba-class destroyers (樺型駆逐艦, Kabagata kuchikukan) were a class of ten destroyers of the Imperial Japanese Navy. Each was named after a variety of tree.

== Background ==
At the outbreak of World War I, the Imperial Japanese Navy had a total of two modern destroyers capable of overseas deployment: the Sakura class Sakura and Tachibana. It was clear that this force would not enable Japan to fulfill its obligations under the Anglo-Japanese Alliance, so the Japanese government pushed through an Emergency Naval Expansion Budget in fiscal 1914 to allow for the construction of ten new destroyers. As speed was of the essence, the orders were given to both government and civilian shipyards (as was the case with the construction of the Russo-Japanese War vintage Kamikaze-class).

Twelve more vessels were built by the same shipyards in Japan per an order from the French Navy, where they were designated the Tribal class (or Arabe class) named Algérien, Annamite, Arabe, Bambara, Hova, Kabyle, Marocain, Sakalave, Sénégalais, Somali, Tonkinois, and Touareg. The Arabe class were the most advanced destroyers in the French inventory in World War I.

== Design ==
These 2nd class destroyers were funded under the September 1914 War Budget. The ten Kaba-class vessels were built simultaneously at eight different shipyards around Japan. As there was no time to design a new vessel, plans for the previous Sakura-class destroyers were distributed to each shipyard, with the instructions that the power plant was to be a conventional coal-fired triple expansion steam engine, and not a steam turbine.

Armament was almost the same as that of the Sakura class, with one QF 4.7 inch Gun Mk I - IV, mounted on the forecastle deck forward of the bridge, and four 3 inch 12 pounder guns, mounted one on either side and two towards the stern of the ship, with two twin torpedo launchers on rotating centreline mounts, although the latter were the new 533mm type instead of the 450mm type in the Sakura class.

== Operational history ==
Given the speed of construction and the fact that eight different shipyards were used, it is a tribute to the Japanese shipbuilders that all ten vessels produced were uniform in appearance and capabilities, and performed reliably in their overseas deployment to the Indian Ocean and the Mediterranean Sea in combat operations in World War I. This deployment began with Rear Admiral Kozo Sato arrived in Malta in mid-April 1917, with the cruiser Akashi as his flagship and eight Kaba-class destroyers. The Japanese fleet was nominally independent, but carried out operations under the direction of the Royal Navy command on Malta, primarily in escort operations for transport and troopship convoys and in anti-submarine warfare operations. Sakaki was damaged by the Austro-Hungarian Navy U-boat U-27 on 11 June 1917 off of Crete with the loss of 68 of her 92 crewmen. She was salvaged and repaired.

All ten vessels survived the war, and were stricken in November 1931 and broken up.

== Ships ==
Construction data
Kanji	Name	Translation	Builder	Laid down	Launched	Completed	Fate
樺	Kaba	Birch Tree	Yokosuka Naval Arsenal	1 December 1914	6 February 1915	5 March 1915	Retired, 1 April 1932
柏	Kashiwa	Oak Tree	Mitsubishi Shipyards, Nagasaki	3 November 1914	14 February 1915	4 April 1915	Retired, 1 April 1932
榊	Sakaki	Sakaki Tree (Cleyera japonica)	Sasebo Naval Arsenal	1 December 1914	4 March 1915	31 March 1915	Retired, 1 April 1932
桂	Katsura	Japanese Judas Tree	Kure Naval Arsenal	5 November 1914	15 February 1915	26 March 1915	Retired, 1 April 1932
杉	Sugi	Japanese Cedar	Osaka Iron Works	24 November 1914	16 February 1915	7 April 1915	Retired, 1 April 1932
楓	Kaede	Maple Tree	Maizuru Naval Arsenal	25 October 1914	20 February 1915	25 March 1915	Retired, 1 April 1932
梅	Ume	Plum Tree	Kawasaki Dockyard Co., Kobe	10 November 1914	27 February 1915	31 March 1915	Retired, 1 April 1932
桐	Kiri	Paulownia Tree	Uraga Dock Company	24 November 1914	28 February 1915	22 April 1915	Retired, 1 April 1932
楠	Kusunoki	Camphor Tree	Kawasaki Dockyard Co, Kobe	10 November 1914	5 March 1915	31 March 1915	Retired, 1 April 1932
松	Matsu	Pine Tree	Mitsubishi Shipyards, Nagasaki	3 November 1914	5 March 1915	6 April 1915	Retired, 1 April 1932
