= French ship Bambara =

At least two ships of the French Navy have been named Bambara:

- French destroyer Bambara, an Arabe-class destroyer launched in 1917 and struck in 1933.
- French frigate Bambara, a Cannon-class destroyer escort launched as USS Swearer in 1943 and transferred to France in 1950. She was broken up in 1959.
