= French ship Touareg =

At least two ships of the French Navy have been named Touareg:

- French destroyer Touareg, an Arabe-class destroyer launched in 1917 and struck in 1935.
- French frigate Touareg, a Cannon-class destroyer escort launched as USS Bright in 1943 and transferred to France in 1950. She was broken up in 1965.
