= French ship Hova =

At least two ships of the French Navy have been named Hova:

- French destroyer Hova, an Arabe-class destroyer launched in 1917 and struck in 1936.
- French frigate Hova, a Cannon-class destroyer escort launched as USS Hova and transferred to France in 1944. She was returned to the US Navy in 1964.
