= French ship Kabyle =

At least two ships of the French Navy have been named Kabyle:

- French destroyer Kabyle, an Arabe-class destroyer launched in 1917 and struck in 1936.
- French frigate Kabyle, a Cannon-class destroyer escort launched as USS Riddle in 1943 and transferred to France in 1950. She was broken up in 1959.
