= French ship Somali =

At least two ships of the French Navy have been named Somali:

- French destroyer Somali, an Arabe-class destroyer launched in 1917 and struck in 1935.
- French frigate Somali, a Cannon-class destroyer escort launched as USS Somali and transferred to France in 1944. She was renamed Arago in 1968 and returned to the USA in 1972.
