= French ship Sénégalais =

At least two ships of the French Navy have been named Sénégalais:

- French destroyer Sénégalais, an Arabe-class destroyer launched in 1917 and struck in 1936.
- French frigate Sénégalais, a Cannon-class destroyer escort launched in 1943 as USS Corbesier and transferred to France in 1944. She was renamed Yser in 1952 and scrapped in 1965.
