= French ship Marocain =

At least two ships of the French Navy have been named Marocain:

- French destroyer Marocain, an Arabe-class destroyer launched in 1917 and struck in 1935.
- French frigate Marocain, a Cannon-class destroyer escort launched as USS Marocain in 1944 and transferred to France. She was returned to the US Navy in 1964.
