= Action of 9 January 1921 =

Short naval battle of the Russian Civil War

- Part of the Southern Front of the Russian Civil War
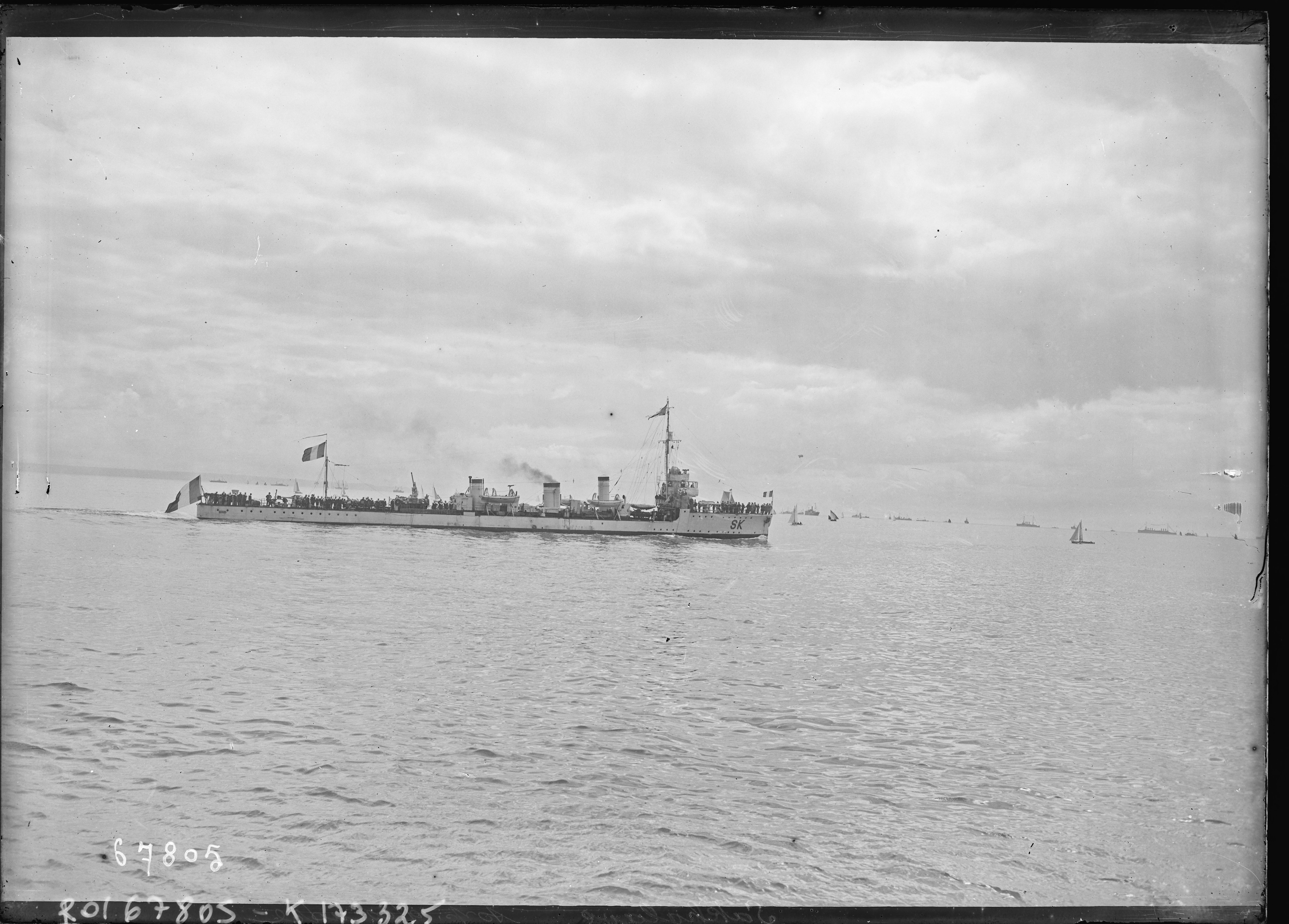
- Sakalave near Le Havre in 1921
Date	9 January 1921
Location	off Anapa, Black Sea
Result	French victory

Belligerents
France	Russian SFSR

Strength
2 destroyers; 1 aviso	1 gunboat

Casualties and losses
Unknown	1 gunboat and its cargo (2 motor torpedo boats) lost; 12 killed; Unknown number of wounded

The action of 9 January 1921 was a short naval battle fought by the French Navy and the Soviet Russia during the Russian Civil War.

== Background ==
During the Russian Civil War, the French Navy was engaged as part of the Allied intervention provided assistance to the White movement engaged into the Southern Front. The French Navy suffered a mutiny in 1919 but operations were carried until the end of the conflict.

== Action ==
The action involved the French Arabe-class destroyers Sakalave and Sénégalais, and also the Arras-class aviso Toul, intercepting on sea the Soviet Elpidifor-class gunboat KL No. 7 (ex-Elpidifor No. 415), which had completed mine-laying operation at Ak-Mechet and was carrying two motor torpedo boats (CMBs) built by Thornycroft. After a short gunfire battle, the Soviet ship was hit, grounded and lost with twelve killed and many wounded close Anapa.

== Aftermath ==
Wreck of KL No. 7 (Elpidifor No. 415) was scrapped in situ in 1922, but some wreckages can still be found.
