= French ship Tonkinois =

At least two ships of the French Navy have been named Tonkinois:

- French destroyer Tonkinois, an Arabe-class destroyer launched in 1917 and struck in 1936.
- French frigate Tonkinois, a River-class frigate launched as HMS Moyola in 1942 and transferred to France in 1944.
