= French ship Sakalave =

At least two ships of the French Navy have been named Sakalave:

- French destroyer Sakalave, an Arabe-class destroyer launched in 1917 and struck in 1936.
- French frigate Sakalave, a Cannon-class destroyer escort launched as USS Wingfield and transferred to France in 1950. She was broken up in 1960.
