= Japanese destroyer Kusunoki (1915) =

Kaba-class destroyer

History

Empire of Japan
- Name: Kusunoki
- Namesake: "Camphor Tree"
- Builder: Kawasaki Shipbuilding, Kobe
- Launched: 5 March 1915
- Completed: 31 March 1915
- Decommissioned: 1 April 1932
- Stricken: November 1931
- Fate: Scrapped, 1932

General characteristics
- Class & type: Kaba-class destroyer
- Displacement: 655 long tons (666 t) (normal); 810 long tons (820 t) (full load)
- Length: 260 ft (79.2 m) (pp); 274 ft (83.5 m) (o/a)
- Beam: 24 ft (7.3 m)
- Draught: 7 ft 9 in (2.4 m)
- Installed power: 4 water-tube boilers; 9,500 ihp (7,100 kW)
- Propulsion: 3 shafts; 3 triple-expansion steam engines
- Speed: 30 knots (56 km/h; 35 mph)
- Range: 1,600 nmi (3,000 km; 1,800 mi) at 15 knots (28 km/h; 17 mph)
- Complement: 92
- Armament: 1 × single 12 cm (4.7 in) gun; 4 × single 3 in (76 mm) guns; 2 × twin 450 mm (17.7 in) torpedo tubes

Kusunoki (楠, "Camphor Tree") was one of 10 Kaba-class destroyers built for the Imperial Japanese Navy during World War I.

== Design and description ==
The Kaba-class destroyers were improved versions of the preceding Sakura class. They displaced 665 long tons (676 t) at normal load and 850 long tons (860 t) at deep load. The ships had a length between perpendiculars of 260 feet (79.2 m) and an overall length of 274 feet (83.5 m), a beam of 24 feet (7.3 m) and a draught of 7 feet 9 inches (2.4 m). The Kabas were powered by three vertical triple-expansion steam engines, each driving one shaft using steam produced by four Kampon water-tube boilers. Two boilers burned a mixture of coal and fuel oil while the other pair only used oil. The engines produced a total of 9,500 indicated horsepower (7,100 kW) that gave the ships a maximum speed of 30 knots (56 km/h; 35 mph). They carried a maximum of 100 long tons (102 t) of coal and 137 long tons (139 t) of oil which gave them a range of 1,600 nautical miles (3,000 km; 1,800 mi) at a speed of 15 knots (28 km/h; 17 mph). Their crew consisted of 92 officers and ratings.

The main armament of the Kaba-class ships consisted of a single quick-firing (QF) 12-centimetre (4.7 in) gun located on the bow. They were also armed with four QF 3-inch (76 mm) guns on single mounts. Two guns were positioned abreast the middle funnel, one gun was on the aft superstructure and the fourth gun was on the stern. The destroyers' torpedo armament consisted of two twin rotating mounts for 450-millimetre (17.7 in) torpedoes located between the superstructure and the stern gun.

== Construction and career ==
Kusunoki was launched on 5 March 1915 at Kawasaki's shipyard in Kobe and completed on 31 March. During World War I the ship patrolled the area around Singapore and later served as a convoy escort in the Mediterranean Sea. She was stricken from the navy list in November 1931, decommissioned on 1 April 1932 and subsequently broken up.

== Bibliography ==
- Friedman, Norman (1985). "Japan". In Gardiner, Robert & Gray, Randal (eds.). Conway's All the World's Fighting Ships 1906–1921. Annapolis: Naval Institute Press. ISBN 0-87021-907-3.
- Friedman, Norman (2011). Naval Weapons of World War One. Barnsley, South Yorkshire, UK: Seaforth. ISBN 978-1-84832-100-7.
- Halpern, Paul G. (1995). A Naval History of World War I. UCL Press. ISBN 978-1-85728-498-0.
- Jentschura, Hansgeorg; Jung, Dieter & Mickel, Peter (1977). Warships of the Imperial Japanese Navy, 1869–1945. Annapolis, Maryland: United States Naval Institute. ISBN 0-87021-893-X.
- Todaka, Kazushige; Fukui, Shizuo; Eldridge, Robert D. & Leonard, Graham B. (2020). Destroyers: Selected Photos from the Archives of the Kure Maritime Museum; the Best from the Collection of Shizuo Fukui's Photos of Japanese Warships. Japanese Naval Warship Photo Album. Annapolis, Maryland: Naval Institute Press. ISBN 978-1-59114-630-8.
- Watts, Anthony J. & Gordon, Brian G. (1971). The Imperial Japanese Navy. London: Macdonald. ISBN 0-35603-045-8.
