= French destroyer Rapière =

Destroyer of the French Navy

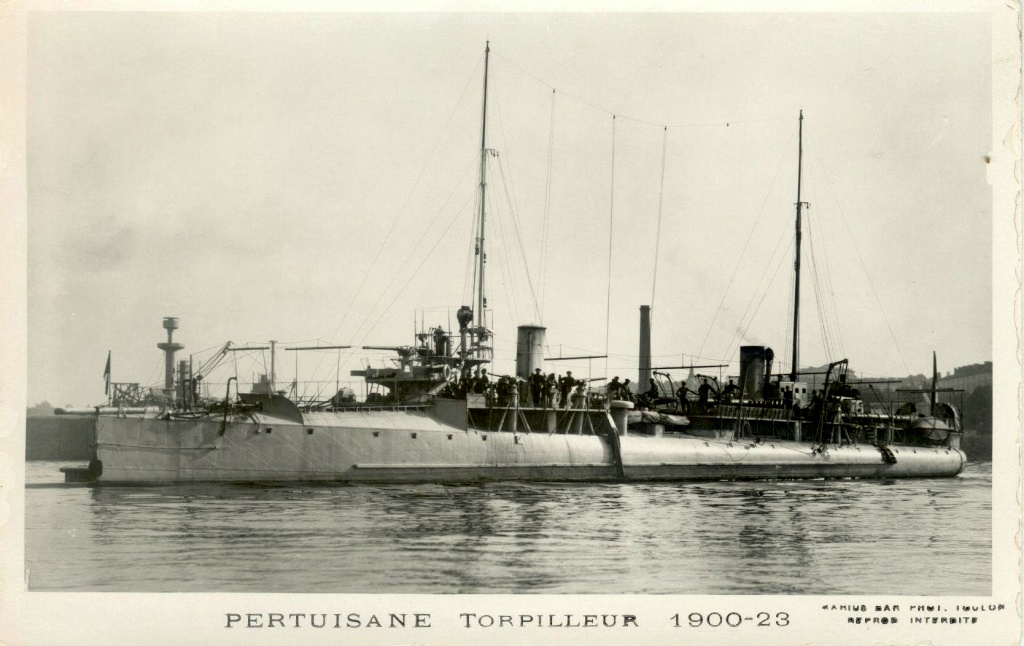
- Sister ship Pertuisane

History

France
- Name: Rapière
- Namesake: Rapier
- Ordered: 8 June 1899
- Builder: Arsenal de Rochefort
- Laid down: 2 January 1900
- Launched: 16 July 1901
- Stricken: 27 October 1921
- Fate: Scrapped after 1921

General characteristics
- Class & type: Pertuisane-class destroyer
- Displacement: 301 long tons (306 t)
- Length: 57.64 m (189 ft 1 in) (o/a)
- Beam: 6.3 m (20 ft 8 in)
- Draft: 3.2 m (10 ft 6 in)
- Installed power: 4 water-tube boilers; 4,800 ihp (3,579 kW)
- Propulsion: 2 shafts; 2 Triple-expansion steam engines
- Speed: 26 knots (48 km/h; 30 mph)
- Range: 2,300 nmi (4,300 km; 2,600 mi) at 10 knots (19 km/h; 12 mph)
- Complement: 52
- Armament: 1 × single 65 mm (2.6 in) gun; 6 × single 47 mm (1.9 in) guns; 2 × single 380 mm (15 in) torpedo tubes

Rapière was a Pertuisane-class destroyer built for the French Navy around the beginning of the 20th century.

== Construction and service ==
When the First World War began in August 1914, Rapière was assigned to the 3rd Destroyer Flotilla (3^{e} escadrille de torpilleurs) of the 2nd Light Squadron (2^{e} escadre légère) based at Cherbourg.

== Bibliography ==
- Campbell, N. J. M. (1979). "France". In Chesneau, Roger & Kolesnik, Eugene M. (eds.). Conway's All the World's Fighting Ships 1860–1905. Greenwich: Conway Maritime Press. pp. 283–333. ISBN 0-8317-0302-4.
- Couhat, Jean Labayle (1974). French Warships of World War I. London: Ian Allan. ISBN 0-7110-0445-5.
- Prévoteaux, Gérard (2017). La marine française dans la Grande guerre: les combattants oubliés: Tome I 1914–1915 [The French Navy during the Great War: The Forgotten Combatants, Book I 1914–1915]. Collection Navires & Histoire des Marines du Mond. Vol. 23. Le Vigen, France: Éditions Lela presse. ISBN 978-2-37468-000-2.
- Prévoteaux, Gérard (2017). La marine française dans la Grande guerre: les combattants oubliés: Tome II 1916–1918 [The French Navy during the Great War: The Forgotten Combatants, Book II 1916–1918]. Collection Navires & Histoire des Marines du Mond. Vol. 27. Le Vigen, France: Éditions Lela presse. ISBN 978-2-37468-001-9.
- Roberts, Stephen S. (2021). French Warships in the Age of Steam 1859–1914: Design, Construction, Careers and Fates. Barnsley, UK: Seaforth Publishing. ISBN 978-1-5267-4533-0.
