= Pertuisane-class destroyer =

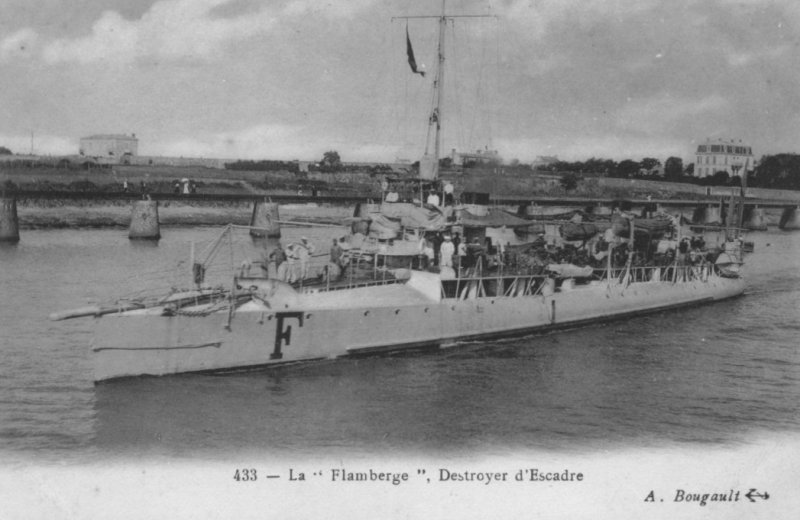
- Flamberge underway in a harbor

Class overview
- Name: Pertuisane class
- Builders: Arsenal de Rochefort
- Operators: French Navy
- Preceded by: Framée class
- Succeeded by: Arquebuse class
- Built: 1899–1901
- In service: 1900–1921
- In commission: 1900–1921
- Completed: 4
- Scrapped: 4

General characteristics
- Type: Destroyer
- Displacement: 301 long tons (306 t)
- Length: 57.64 m (189 ft 1 in) (o/a)
- Beam: 6.3 m (20 ft 8 in)
- Draft: 3.2 m (10 ft 6 in)
- Installed power: 4,800 ihp (3,579 kW); 2 water-tube boilers
- Propulsion: 2 shafts; 2 Triple-expansion steam engines
- Speed: 26 knots (48 km/h; 30 mph)
- Range: 2,300 nmi (4,300 km; 2,600 mi) at 10 knots (19 km/h; 12 mph)
- Complement: 52
- Armament: 1 × single 65 mm (2.6 in) gun; 6 × single 47 mm (1.9 in) guns; 2 × single 380 mm (15 in) torpedo tubes

The Pertuisane class (sometimes referred to as the Rochefortais class as they were all built in Rochefort) was a group of four destroyers built for the French Navy in the first decade of the 20th century. They survived the First World War only to be scrapped afterwards.

== Ships ==
- Pertuisane - launched 5 December 1900, stricken 16 March 1923.
- Escopette - launched 20 December 1900, stricken 4 April 1921.
- Flamberge - launched 28 October 1900, stricken 1 October 1920.
- Rapière - launched 16 July 1901, stricken 27 October 1921.

Escopette was sent by the French government on 25 July 1909 as a seaborne escort for Louis Blériot's English Channel-crossing flight.

== Bibliography ==
- Campbell, N. J. M. (1979). "France". In Chesneau, Roger & Kolesnik, Eugene M. (eds.). Conway's All the World's Fighting Ships 1860–1905. Greenwich: Conway Maritime Press. pp. 283–333. ISBN 0-8317-0302-4.
- Couhat, Jean Labayle (1974). French Warships of World War I. London: Ian Allan. ISBN 0-7110-0445-5.
- Osborne, Eric W. (2005). Destroyers - An Illustrated History of Their Impact. Santa Barbara, California: ABC-Clio. ISBN 1-85109-479-2.
- Jordan, John (2025). "The 300-Tonnes: The First French Torpedo Boat Destroyer". In Jordan, John (ed.). Warship 2025. London: Bloomsbury Publishing. pp. 111–132. ISBN 978-1-4728-6854-1.
- Prévoteaux, Gérard (2017). La marine française dans la Grande guerre: les combattants oubliés: Tome I 1914–1915 [The French Navy during the Great War: The Forgotten Combatants, Book I 1914–1915]. Collection Navires & Histoire des Marines du Mond. Vol. 23. Le Vigen, France: Éditions Lela presse. ISBN 978-2-37468-000-2.
- Prévoteaux, Gérard (2017). La marine française dans la Grande guerre: les combattants oubliés: Tome II 1916–1918 [The French Navy during the Great War: The Forgotten Combatants, Book II 1916–1918]. Collection Navires & Histoire des Marines du Mond. Vol. 27. Le Vigen, France: Éditions Lela presse. ISBN 978-2-37468-001-9.
- Roberts, Stephen S. (2021). French Warships in the Age of Steam 1859–1914: Design, Construction, Careers and Fates. Barnsley, UK: Seaforth Publishing. ISBN 978-1-5267-4533-0.
- Roche, Jean-Michel (2005). Dictionnaire des bâtiments de la flotte de guerre française de Colbert à nos jours [Dictionary of French Warships from Colbert to the Present Day]. Vol. II: 1870–2006. Group Retozel-Maury Millau. ISBN 978-2-9525917-0-6. OCLC 165892922.
