= French destroyer Escopette =

Destroyer of the French Navy

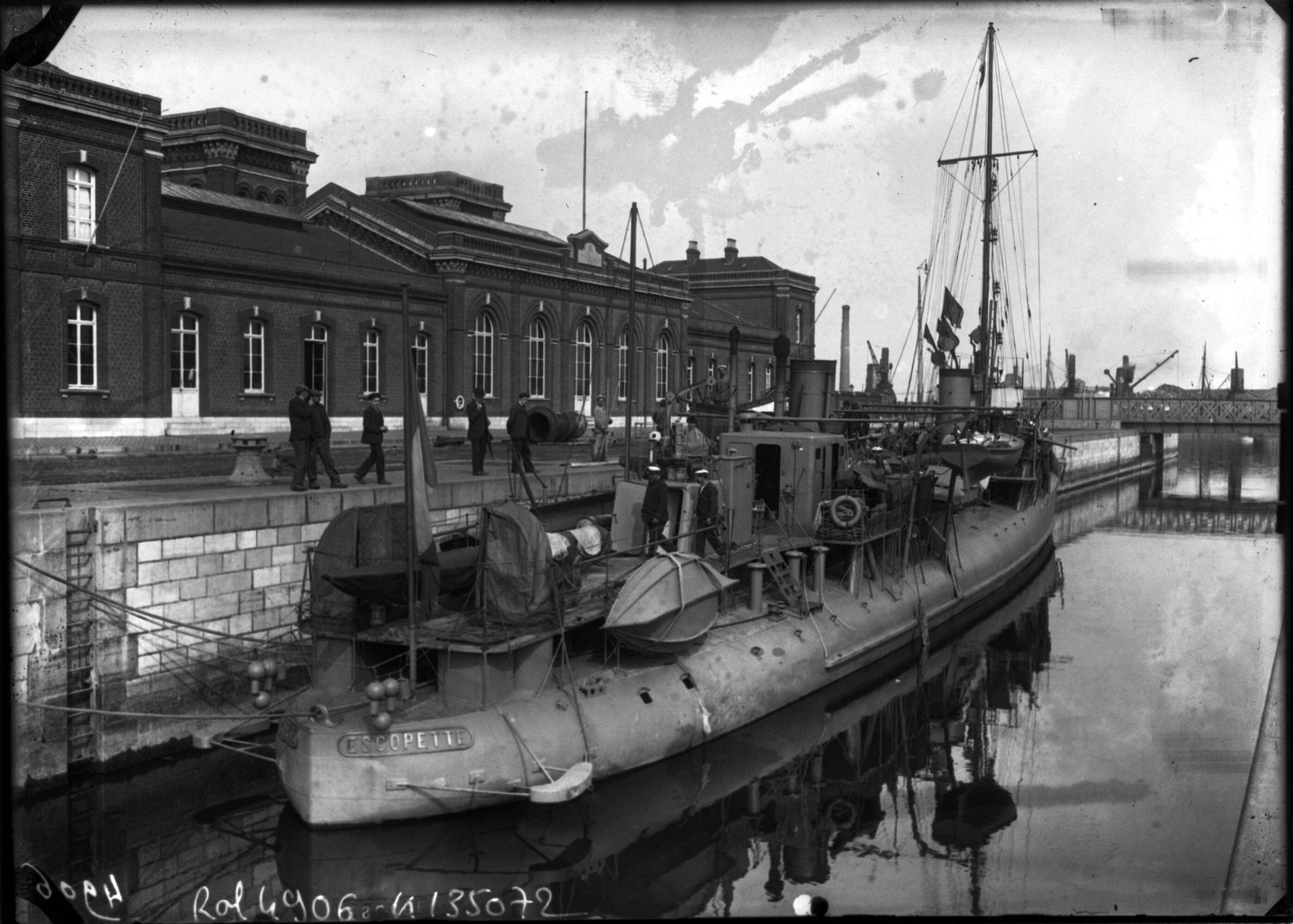
- Escopette in 1909

History

France
- Name: Escopette
- Namesake: Early carbine used by French cavalry
- Ordered: 8 June 1899
- Builder: Arsenal de Rochefort
- Laid down: January 1900
- Launched: 20 December 1900
- Stricken: 4 April 1921

General characteristics
- Class & type: Pertuisane-class destroyer
- Displacement: 301 long tons (306 t)
- Length: 57.64 m (189 ft 1 in) (o/a)
- Beam: 6.3 m (20 ft 8 in)
- Draft: 3.2 m (10 ft 6 in)
- Installed power: 4 water-tube boilers; 4,800 ihp (3,579 kW)
- Propulsion: 2 shafts; 2 Triple-expansion steam engines
- Speed: 26 knots (48 km/h; 30 mph)
- Range: 2,300 nmi (4,300 km; 2,600 mi) at 10 knots (19 km/h; 12 mph)
- Complement: 52
- Armament: 1 × single 65 mm (2.6 in) gun; 6 × single 47 mm (1.9 in) guns; 2 × single 380 mm (15 in) torpedo tubes

Escopette was a Pertuisane-class destroyer built for the French Navy around the beginning of the 20th century.

== Construction and career ==
Escopette was ordered from Arsenal de Rochefort on 8 June 1899 and was laid down on 9 April 1900. The ship was launched on 20 December 1900 and conducted her sea trials from June 1902 to January 1903. She was commissioned on 26 January and assigned to the Northern Squadron.

Escopette made the headlines in July 1909 as the ship was chosen to escort Louis Blériot cross channel pioneering flight (with Mrs Alice Blériot on board). Sailing under maximum power Escopette was soon outrun by Blériot's monoplane. Contrary to Hubert Latham's unsuccessful flight where the non-swimmer pilot was rescued by another French destroyer Harpon, when his Antoinette aircraft crashed into the channel after engine trouble, Escopette made a fast but uneventful passage to Dover where Mr and Mrs Blériot where reunited.

Louis Blériot chose to name his seaside villa "Villa Escopette" in Hardelot as a tribute to his escorting ship. Though the villa was destroyed during WW1 a memorial still exists on site.

When the First World War began in August 1914, Escopette was one of the leaders (divisionnaire) in the 2nd Submarine Flotilla (2^{e} escadrille sous-marins) of the 2nd Light Squadron (2^{e} escadre légère) based at Calais.

== Bibliography ==
- Campbell, N. J. M. (1979). "France". In Chesneau, Roger & Kolesnik, Eugene M. (eds.). Conway's All the World's Fighting Ships 1860–1905. Greenwich: Conway Maritime Press. pp. 283–333. ISBN 0-8317-0302-4.
- Prévoteaux, Gérard (2017). La marine française dans la Grande guerre: les combattants oubliés: Tome I 1914–1915 [The French Navy during the Great War: The Forgotten Combatants, Book I 1914–1915]. Collection Navires & Histoire des Marines du Mond. Vol. 23. Le Vigen, France: Éditions Lela presse. ISBN 978-2-37468-000-2.
- Prévoteaux, Gérard (2017). La marine française dans la Grande guerre: les combattants oubliés: Tome II 1916–1918 [The French Navy during the Great War: The Forgotten Combatants, Book II 1916–1918]. Collection Navires & Histoire des Marines du Mond. Vol. 27. Le Vigen, France: Éditions Lela presse. ISBN 978-2-37468-001-9.
- Couhat, Jean Labayle (1974). French Warships of World War I. London: Ian Allan. ISBN 0-7110-0445-5.
- Roberts, Stephen S. (2021). French Warships in the Age of Steam 1859–1914: Design, Construction, Careers and Fates. Barnsley, UK: Seaforth Publishing. ISBN 978-1-5267-4533-0.
