= French destroyer Algérien =

Destroyer of the French Navy

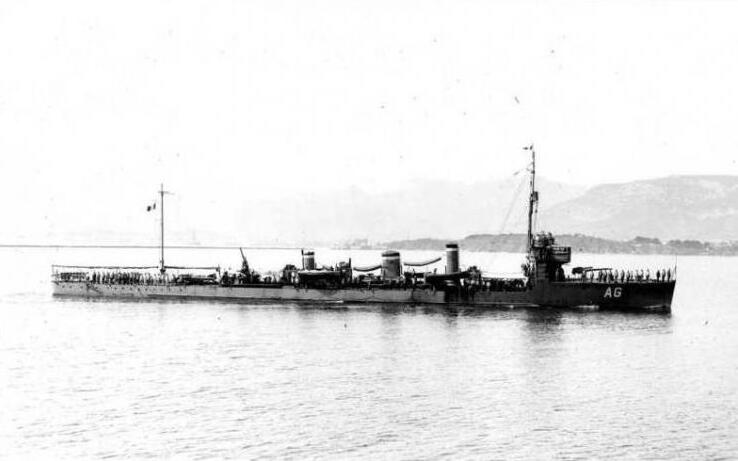
- Algérien in 1917

History

France
- Name: Algérien
- Namesake: Algerian people
- Ordered: 1916
- Builder: Yokosuka Naval Arsenal, Yokosuka, Japan
- Laid down: 1917
- Launched: 1917
- Completed: 1917
- In service: September 1917
- Stricken: 14 June 1936
- Fate: Scrapped after 1936

General characteristics
- Class & type: Arabe-class destroyer
- Displacement: 685 t (674 long tons)
- Length: 82.26 m (269 ft 11 in) (o/a); 79.4 m (260 ft 6 in) (p/p)
- Beam: 7.33 m (24 ft 1 in)
- Draft: 2.39 m (7 ft 10 in)
- Installed power: 4 Kampon water-tube boilers; 10,000 PS (7,400 kW; 9,900 shp)
- Propulsion: 3 shafts; 3 triple-expansion steam engines
- Speed: 29 knots (54 km/h; 33 mph)
- Range: 2,000 nmi (3,700 km; 2,300 mi) at 12 knots (22 km/h; 14 mph)
- Complement: 109
- Armament: 1 × single 120 mm (4.7 in) gun; 4 × single 76 mm (3 in) guns; 2 × twin 450 mm (17.7 in) torpedo tubes

The French destroyer Algérien was one of a dozen Arabe-class destroyers built for the French Navy in Japan during the First World War.

== Design and description ==
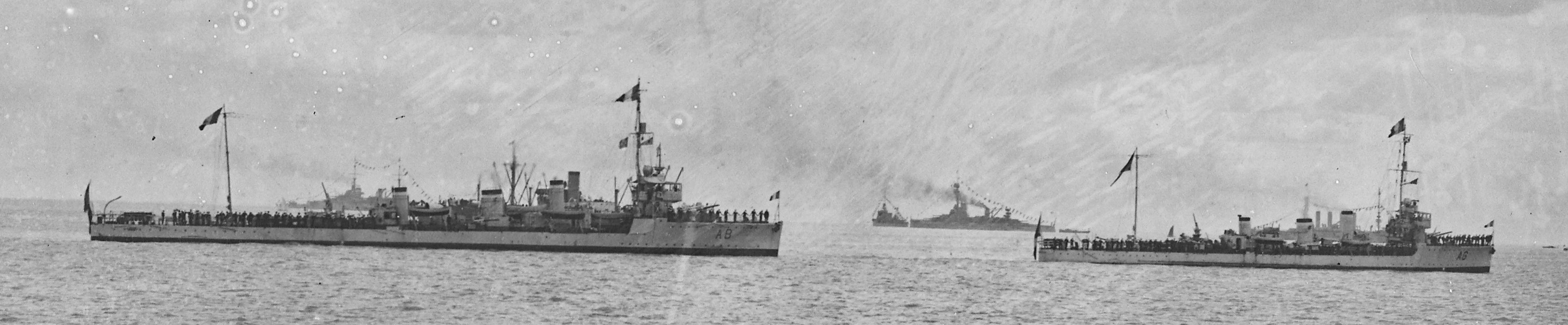
Arabe (left) and Algérien (right) in 1921

The Arabe-class ships had an overall length of 82.26 meters (269 ft 11 in), a length between perpendiculars of 79.4 meters (260 ft 6 in) a beam of 7.33 meters (24 ft 1 in), and a draft of 2.39 meters (7 ft 10 in). The ships displaced 865 metric tons (851 long tons) at normal load. They were powered by three vertical triple-expansion steam engines, each driving one propeller shaft, using steam provided by four mixed-firing Kampon Yarrow-type boilers. The engines were designed to produce 10,000 metric horsepower (7,400 kW; 9,900 shp), which would propel the ships at 29 knots (54 km/h; 33 mph). During their sea trials, the Arabe class reached 29.16–30.44 knots (54.00–56.37 km/h; 33.56–35.03 mph). The ships carried enough coal and fuel oil which gave them a range of 2,000 nautical miles (3,700 km; 2,300 mi) at 12 knots (22 km/h; 14 mph). Their crew consisted of 5 officers and 104 crewmen.

The main armament of the Arabe-class ships was a single Type 41 12-centimeter (4.7 in) gun, mounted before the bridge on the forecastle. Their secondary armament consisted of four Type 41 76-millimeter (3 in) guns in single mounts; two of these were positioned abreast the middle funnel and the others were on the centerline further aft. One of these latter guns was on a high-angle mount and served as an anti-aircraft gun. The ships carried two above-water twin mounts for 450-millimeter (17.7 in) torpedo tubes. In 1917–18, a rack for eight 75-kilogram (165 lb) depth charges was added.

== Construction and career ==
Algérien was ordered from Yokosuka Naval Arsenal and was launched in 1917. The ship was completed in September of that year. She was stricken on 14 June 1936 and subsequently broken up for scrap.
