= French destroyer Pertuisane =

Destroyer of the French Navy

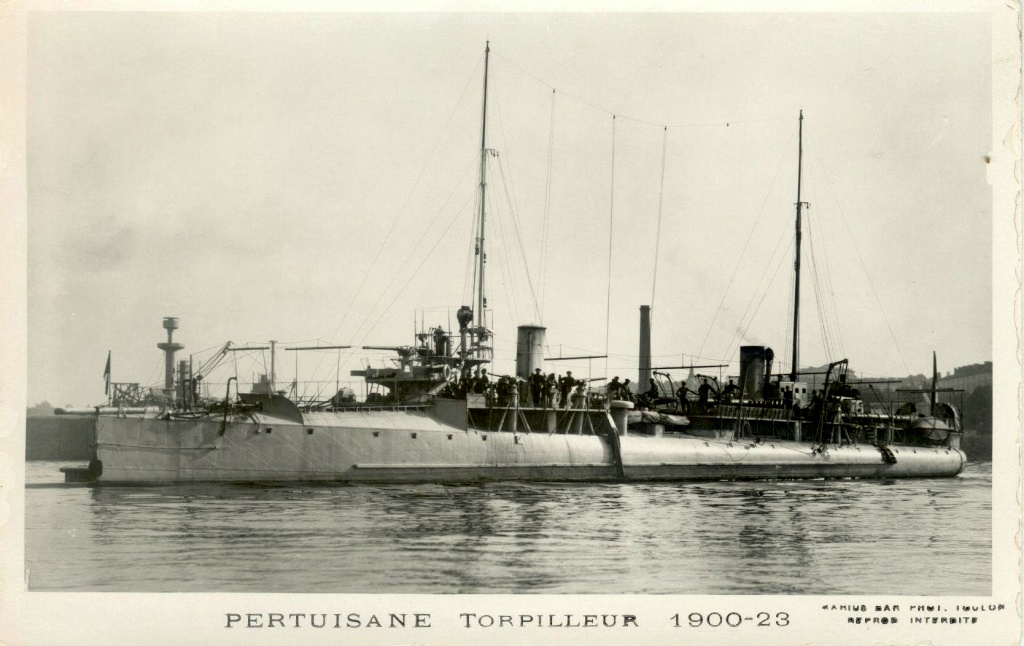
- Pertuisane in harbor

History

France
- Name: Pertuisane
- Namesake: Partisan
- Ordered: 8 June 1899
- Builder: Arsenal de Rochefort
- Laid down: June 1899
- Launched: 5 December 1900
- Stricken: 16 March 1923
- Fate: Sold for scrap, 20 April 1928

General characteristics
- Class & type: Pertuisane-class destroyer
- Displacement: 301 long tons (306 t)
- Length: 57.64 m (189 ft 1 in) (o/a)
- Beam: 6.3 m (20 ft 8 in)
- Draft: 3.2 m (10 ft 6 in)
- Installed power: 4 water-tube boilers; 4,800 ihp (3,579 kW)
- Propulsion: 2 shafts; 2 Triple-expansion steam engines
- Speed: 26 knots (48 km/h; 30 mph)
- Range: 2,300 nmi (4,300 km; 2,600 mi) at 10 knots (19 km/h; 12 mph)
- Complement: 52
- Armament: 1 × single 65 mm (2.6 in) gun; 6 × single 47 mm (1.9 in) guns; 2 × single 380 mm (15 in) torpedo tubes

Pertuisane was the name ship of her class of four destroyers built for the French Navy around the beginning of the 20th century.
