= French destroyer Annamite =

Destroyer of the French Navy

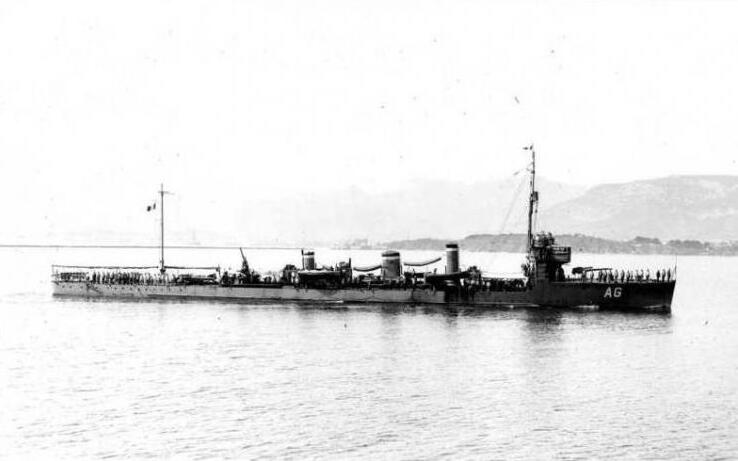
- Sister ship Algérien in 1917

History

France
- Name: Annamite
- Namesake: Annamite
- Ordered: 1916
- Builder: Yokosuka Naval Arsenal, Yokosuka, Japan
- Laid down: 1917
- Launched: 1917
- Completed: 1917
- In service: 1917
- Stricken: 18 August 1933
- Fate: Scrapped after 1933

General characteristics
- Class & type: Arabe-class destroyer
- Displacement: 685 t (674 long tons)
- Length: 82.26 m (269 ft 11 in) (o/a); 79.4 m (260 ft 6 in) (p/p)
- Beam: 7.33 m (24 ft 1 in)
- Draft: 2.39 m (7 ft 10 in)
- Installed power: 4 Kampon water-tube boilers; 10,000 PS (7,400 kW; 9,900 shp)
- Propulsion: 3 shafts; 3 triple-expansion steam engines
- Speed: 29 knots (54 km/h; 33 mph)
- Range: 2,000 nmi (3,700 km; 2,300 mi) at 12 knots (22 km/h; 14 mph)
- Complement: 109
- Armament: 1 × single 120 mm (4.7 in) gun; 4 × single 76 mm (3 in) guns; 2 × twin 450 mm (17.7 in) torpedo tubes

The French destroyer Annamite was one of a dozen Arabe-class destroyers built for the French Navy in Japan during the First World War.

== Design and description ==
The Arabe-class ships had an overall length of 82.26 meters (269 ft 11 in), a length between perpendiculars of 79.4 meters (260 ft 6 in) a beam of 7.33 meters (24 ft 1 in), and a draft of 2.39 meters (7 ft 10 in). The ships displaced 865 metric tons (851 long tons) at normal load. They were powered by three vertical triple-expansion steam engines, each driving one propeller shaft, using steam provided by four mixed-firing Kampon Yarrow-type boilers. The engines were designed to produce 10,000 metric horsepower (7,400 kW; 9,900 shp), which would propel the ships at 29 knots (54 km/h; 33 mph). During their sea trials, the Arabe class reached 29.16–30.44 knots (54.00–56.37 km/h; 33.56–35.03 mph). The ships carried enough coal and fuel oil which gave them a range of 2,000 nautical miles (3,700 km; 2,300 mi) at 12 knots (22 km/h; 14 mph). Their crew consisted of 5 officers and 104 crewmen.

The main armament of the Arabe-class ships was a single Type 41 12-centimeter (4.7 in) gun, mounted before the bridge on the forecastle. Their secondary armament consisted of four Type 41 76-millimeter (3 in) guns in single mounts; two of these were positioned abreast the middle funnel and the others were on the centerline further aft. One of these latter guns was on a high-angle mount and served as an anti-aircraft gun. The ships carried two above-water twin mounts for 450-millimeter (17.7 in) torpedo tubes. In 1917–18, a rack for eight 75-kilogram (165 lb) depth charges was added.

== Construction and career ==
Annamite was ordered from Yokosuka Naval Arsenal and was launched in 1917 and completed later that year. She was stricken on 18 August 1933 and subsequently broken up for scrap.
