= Kawasaki Shipbuilding Corporation =

Japanese shipbuilder

Kawasaki Heavy Industries Ship & Offshore Structure Company
- Native name: 川崎重工業船舶海洋カンパニー
- Formerly: Kawasaki Shipbuilding Corporation
- Company type: Division of Kawasaki Heavy Industries
- Industry: Shipbuilding
- Headquarters: Kobe, Japan
- Products: Ships
- Website: global.kawasaki.com/en/corp/profile/division/ship/index.html

Logo between 2002 and 2010

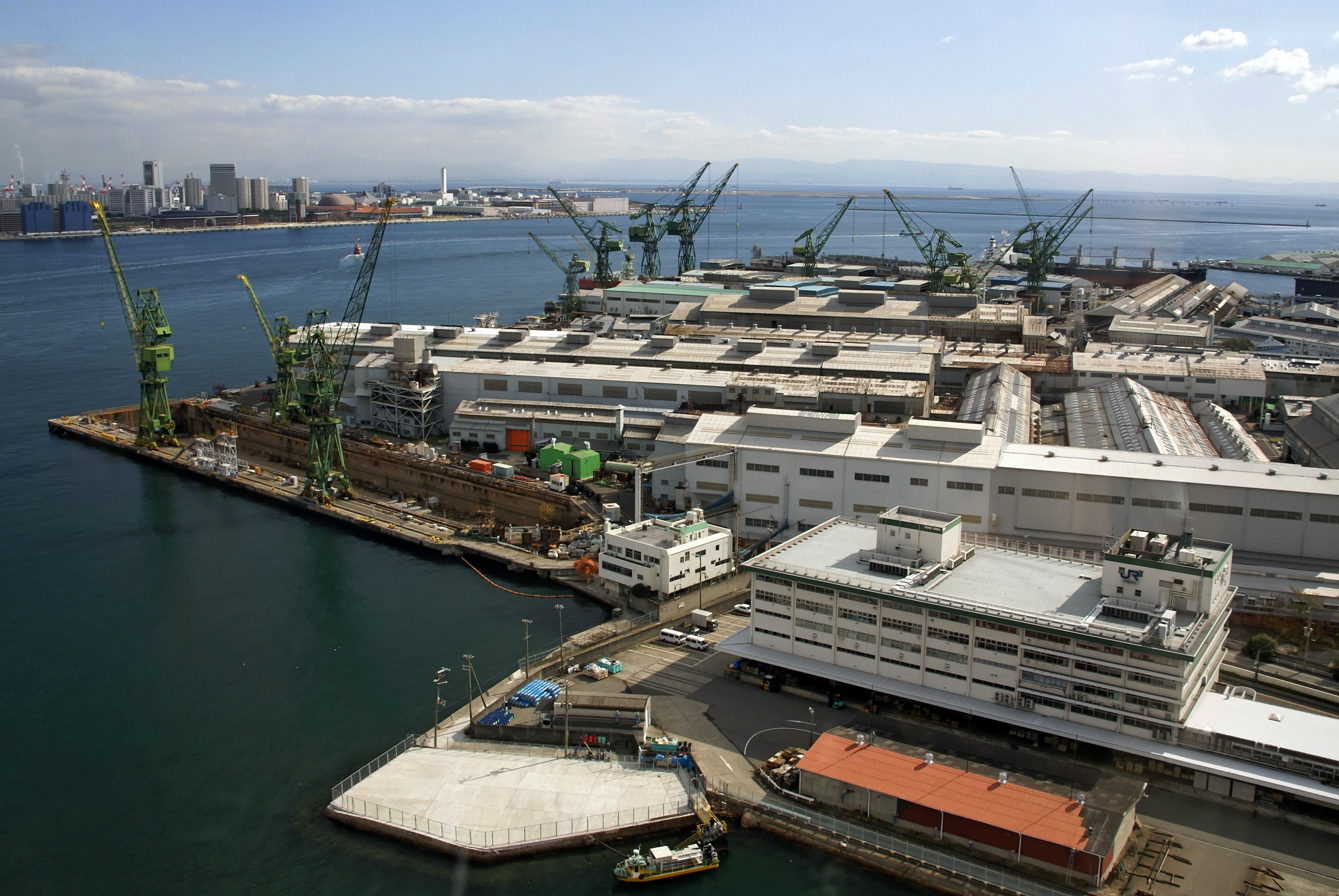
Kawasaki Shipbuilding Corp – Kobe Works

Kawasaki Heavy Industries Ship & Offshore Structure Company (川崎重工業船舶海洋カンパニー, Kawasaki Jūkōgyō Senpaku Kaiyō Kanpanī) is the shipbuilding subsidiary of Kawasaki Heavy Industries. It produces primarily specialized commercial vessels, including LNG carriers, LPG carriers, container ships, bulk carriers, oil tankers, as well as high speed passenger jetfoils. In addition, it is also a producer of warships for the Japan Maritime Self-Defense Force, including submarines. Kawasaki also produces marine machinery, including marine engines, thrusters, steering gears, deck and fishing machinery.

== History ==
Kawasaki's origins go back to April 1878, when Shozo Kawasaki established Kawasaki Tsukiji Shipyard in Tokyo with the support of fellow Satsuma native and Vice Minister of Finance, Matsukata Masayoshi.

In 1886, Kawasaki established a second shipyard in Kobe, Hyōgo prefecture. With the First Sino-Japanese War, the two shipyards were flooded with new orders and ship repair requests. The two shipyards were merged in 1896 as the Kawasaki Dockyard Company, Ltd. Realizing the limitation of private management, Kawasaki decided to take the company public, and (as he had no son) chose Matsukata Kojiro, the third son of Matsukata Masayoshi, as his successor. Matsukata remained president for the next 32 years until 1928. Matsukata expanded business into rolling stock, aircraft, automobiles and shipping. He also implemented Japan's first eight-hour work day system in 1919, after a massive strike by 30,000 workers threatened to bring down the government of Prime Minister Takashi Hara.

Under Matsukata, Kawasaki Dockyards expanded its Hyōgo operations with a large dry dock, completed in 1902. This dry dock is now listed as an Important Cultural Property by the Japanese government. In 1906, after numerous technical difficulties, Kawasaki completed the first submarines made in Japan for the Imperial Japanese Navy. Kawasaki produced numerous warships for the Japanese navy, ranging from destroyers to aircraft carriers until the end of World War II.

Kawasaki started manufacturing rolling stock in 1907, and 4 years later produced its first steam locomotive, for the Japanese Ministry of Railways. Kawasaki manufactured 3,237 steam locomotives in total until 1971. This division was spun off in 1928 and incorporated as Kawasaki Heavy Industries Rolling Stock Company.

In 1918, an Aircraft Division was established at the Hyōgo Works, only 15 years after the Wright brothers first flight. Kawasaki went on to build numerous innovative designs for the Imperial Japanese Army and Navy air services prior to World War II. In 1937, the Aircraft Division was spun off and incorporated as Kawasaki Aircraft Co., Ltd.

In 1969, Kawasaki Dockyard, Kawasaki Rolling Stock Manufacturing and Kawasaki Aircraft merged to become Kawasaki Heavy Industries.

However, in 2002, Kawasaki Shipbuilding Corporation reemerged as a wholly owned subsidiary company. It was converted back into a division in 2010.

== Products ==
- Oil Tankers
- LNG carriers
- Bulk carriers
- Container Ships
- Ro/Ro Vessels
- Jetfoils
- Warships
  - Fuyushio, Natsushio-class submarine
  - Unryū, Soryū-class submarine
  - Oyashio, Uzushio, Isoshio, Kuroshio, Yaeshio, Mochishio, Oyashio-class submarine
  - Natsushio, Arashio, Fuyushio, Harushio-class submarine
  - Kaga, Tosa-Class Battleship, converted into an Aircraft Carrier (Finished by Yokosuka)
  - Zuikaku, Shōkaku-class Aircraft Carrier
  - Taiho, Taiho-class aircraft carrier
  - Ise, Ise-class battleship
  - Haruna, Kongō-class battlecruiser
  - Thonburi-class coastal defence ship
- Marine steam turbines
- Marine diesel engines
- Marine Thrusters
- Ship Control Systems
