= Arabe-class destroyer =

WWI Japanese-built French ship class

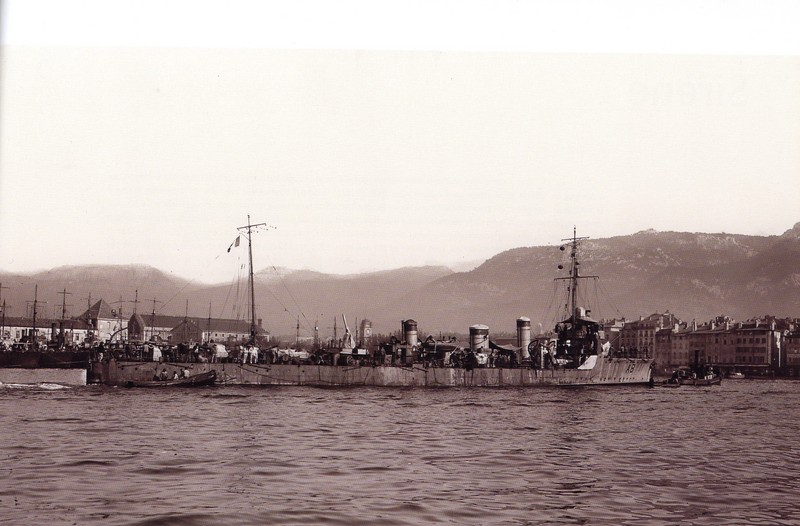

Class overview
- Name: Arabe class
- Builders: Yokosuka Naval Arsenal; Kure Naval Arsenal; Sasebo Naval Arsenal; Maizuru Naval Arsenal; Kawasaki, Kobe; Mitsubishi, Nagasaki
- Operators: French Navy
- Preceded by: Aventurier class
- Succeeded by: Enseigne Gabolde
- Built: 1917
- In service: 1917–1936
- In commission: 1917–1936
- Completed: 12
- Scrapped: 12

General characteristics
- Type: Destroyer
- Displacement: 685 t (674 long tons)
- Length: 82.26 m (269 ft 11 in) (o/a); 79.4 m (260 ft 6 in) (p/p)
- Beam: 7.33 m (24 ft 1 in)
- Draft: 2.39 m (7 ft 10 in)
- Installed power: 4 Kampon water-tube boilers; 10,000 PS (7,400 kW; 9,900 shp)
- Propulsion: 3 shafts; 3 triple-expansion steam engines
- Speed: 29 knots (54 km/h; 33 mph)
- Range: 2,000 nmi (3,700 km; 2,300 mi) at 12 knots (22 km/h; 14 mph)
- Complement: 86
- Armament: 1 × single 120 mm (4.7 in) gun; 4 × single 76 mm (3.0 in) guns; 2 × twin 450 mm (17.7 in) torpedo tubes

The Arabe-class destroyers was a group of twelve destroyers built for the French Navy during the First World War. All the ships were built in Japan as an export version of the Kaba class, and were named after ethnic groups within the French Empire at the time.

== Design and description ==
The French Navy ordered the Arabe-class ships from Japan as it was in desperate need of additional destroyers and there was no capacity to build more in France, Great Britain or the United States. They had an overall length of 82.26 meters (269 ft 11 in), a length between perpendiculars of 79.4 meters (260 ft 6 in) a beam of 7.33 meters (24 ft 1 in), and a draft of 2.39 meters (7 ft 10 in). The ships displaced 865 metric tons (851 long tons) at normal load. They were powered by three vertical triple-expansion steam engines, each driving one propeller shaft, using steam provided by four mixed-firing Kampon Yarrow-type boilers. The engines were designed to produce 10,000 metric horsepower (7,400 kW; 9,900 shp), which would propel the ships at 29 knots (54 km/h; 33 mph). During their sea trials, the Arabe class reached 29.16–30.44 knots (54.00–56.37 km/h; 33.56–35.03 mph). The ships carried 102 metric tons (100 long tons) of coal and 118 metric tons (116 long tons) of fuel oil which gave them a range of 2,000 nautical miles (3,700 km; 2,300 mi) at 12 knots (22 km/h; 14 mph). Their crew consisted of 5 officers and 104 crewmen.

The main armament of the Arabe-class ships was a single Type 41 12-centimeter (4.7 in) gun, mounted before the bridge on the forecastle. Their secondary armament consisted of four Type 41 76-millimeter (3.0 in) guns in single mounts; two of these were positioned abreast the middle funnel and the others were on the centerline further aft. One of these latter guns was on a high-angle mount and served as an anti-aircraft gun. The ships carried two above-water twin mounts for 450-millimeter (17.7 in) torpedo tubes. In 1917–18, a rack for eight 75-kilogram (165 lb) depth charges was added.

== Ships ==
- Algérien — launched 1917, struck 1936.
- Annamite — launched 1917, struck 1933.
- Arabe — launched 1917, struck 1936.
- Bambara — launched 1917, struck 1933.
- Hova — launched 1917, struck 1936.
- Kabyle — launched 1917, struck 1936.
- Marocain — launched 1917, struck 1935.
- Sakalave — launched 1917, struck 1936.
- Sénégalais — launched 1917, struck 1936.
- Somali — launched 1917, struck 1935.
- Tonkinois — launched 1917, struck 1936.
- Touareg — launched 1917, struck 1935.
