= Claymore (disambiguation) =

A claymore is a two-handed sword, particularly the Scottish cross-hilted great sword.

Claymore may also refer to:

== Places ==
- Claymore, New South Wales, Australia
- Claymore oilfield, North Sea; an oilfield northeast of Aberdeen, Scotland, UK
- Claymore Creek, South Dakota, USA; a creek

== People and characters ==
- Claymore J. Flapdoodle, the pseudonym of Magic-the-Gathering card artist Phil Foglio (born 1956)

=== Fictional characters ===
- Claymore (G.I. Joe), a character in the G.I. Joe universe
- Claymores, a character class from the media franchise Claymore; see List of Claymore characters
- Claymore, a character in the video game Dragon Quest Swords

== Arts, entertainment, and media ==
- Claymore (manga), a heroic manga-anime media franchise
- "Claymore", a song by Isaiah Rashad from the 2021 album The House Is Burning

== Groups, companies, organizations ==
- Scottish Claymores, a WLAF American-football team in Scotland
- Claymore Game Studios, a videogame developer
- Claymore Group, a subsidiary of Guggenheim Partners, an investment company
- Claymore Books, a British publisher

== Watercraft ==
- Claymore-class destroyer, a group of thirteen destroyers built for the French Navy in the first decade of the 20th century
  - French destroyer Claymore, a French Navy Claymore-class destroyer
- MV Claymore, a shipname for motor vessels
  - MV Claymore (1955), a mail boat
  - MV Claymore (1978), a ferry
  - MV Claymore (2024), a ferry
  - MV Claymore 2, a passenger and cargo ship
- HMS Claymore, a WWII British Royal Navy Weapon-class destroyer
- SS Empire Claymore, the British WWII Empire ship 'Claymore'

== Weapons ==
- M18 Claymore mine, an explosive weapon
- Scottish broadsword, a basket-hilted sword, sometimes also included as claymores

== Other uses ==
- Operation Claymore, a WWII British/Norwegian commando raid
