= French destroyer Carquois =

Destroyer of the French Navy

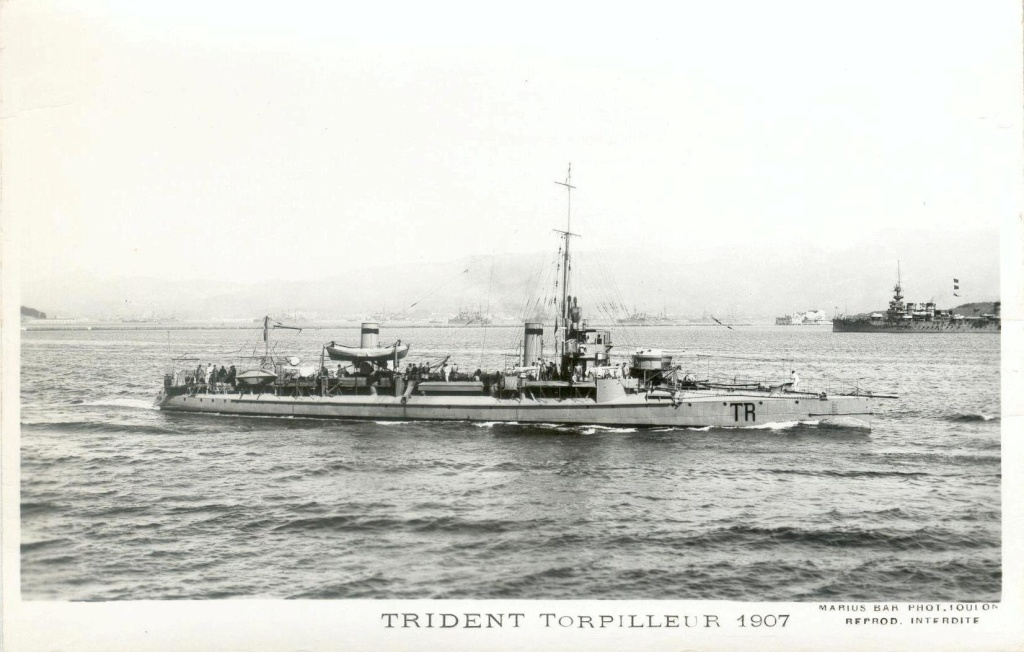
- Sister ship Trident underway in harbor

History

France
- Name: Carquois
- Namesake: Quiver
- Builder: Arsenal de Rochefort
- Laid down: 10 July 1905
- Launched: 29 June 1907
- Stricken: 29 November 1930

General characteristics
- Class & type: Claymore-class destroyer
- Displacement: 356 t (350 long tons)
- Length: 58 m (190 ft 3 in) (waterline)
- Beam: 6.53 m (21 ft 5 in)
- Draft: 2.95 m (9 ft 8 in)
- Installed power: 2 Normand boilers; 6,800 ihp (5,071 kW)
- Propulsion: 2 shafts; 2 triple-expansion steam engines
- Speed: 28 knots (52 km/h; 32 mph)
- Range: 2,300 nmi (4,300 km; 2,600 mi) at 10 knots (19 km/h; 12 mph)
- Complement: 60
- Armament: 1 × 65 mm (2.6 in) gun; 6 × 47 mm (1.9 in) Hotchkiss guns; 2 × 450 mm (17.7 in) torpedo tubes

Carquois was one of 13 Claymore-class destroyers built for the French Navy in the first decade of the 20th century.

== Construction and career ==
Carquois was ordered on 5 July 1904 and was laid down at the Arsenal de Rochefort five days later. The ship was launched on 26 June 1907 and was assigned to the Mediterranean Squadron (Escadre de la Méditerranée) after her completion in August 1908. She remained with that unit after it was redesignated as the Third Squadron (3^{e} Escadre) until she was transferred to the 2nd Squadron at Brest in September 1911. Carquois was assigned to the 1st Destroyer Flotilla (1^{re} escadrille de torpilleurs) when the 2nd Squadron was reorganized and renamed the 2nd Light Squadron (2^{e} escadre légère) in November.

When the First World War began in August 1914, Carquois was still assigned to the 1st Destroyer Flotilla at Brest and remained with the unit through 1915. She was transferred to the North Sea Flotilla (Flotille de la mer du Nord), based at Dunkerque, the following year. On 24 May 1916, her sister ship, Obusier struck a mine and was disabled. The destroyer followed her sister into the minefield to render assistance and towed her back to port. Carquois remained with the flotilla for the rest of the war. She served with the 3rd Aviso Squadron (Escadrille d'avisos) of the 3rd Maritime Region (3^{e} region Maritime) from 1919 to 23 October 1926 when she was disarmed. The ship was unsuccessfully listed for sale as a patrol boat in 1926–1929, but was not struck from the naval register until 29 November 1930 and condemned 2 days later. She was sold for scrap on 9 July 1931.

== Bibliography ==
- Campbell, N. J. M. (1979). "France". In Chesneau, Roger & Kolesnik, Eugene M. (eds.). Conway's All the World's Fighting Ships 1860–1905. Greenwich: Conway Maritime Press. pp. 283–333. ISBN 0-8317-0302-4.
- Couhat, Jean Labayle (1974). French Warships of World War I. London: Ian Allan. ISBN 0-7110-0445-5.
- Le Masson, Henri (1967). Histoire du Torpilleur en France [History of the Torpedo-armed Ship in France]. Paris: Académie de marine. OCLC 491016784.
- Prévoteaux, Gérard (2017). La marine française dans la Grande guerre: les combattants oubliés: Tome I 1914–1915 [The French Navy during the Great War: The Forgotten Combatants, Book I 1914–1915]. Collection Navires & Histoire des Marines du Mond. Vol. 23. Le Vigen, France: Éditions Lela presse. ISBN 978-2-37468-000-2.
- Prévoteaux, Gérard (2017). La marine française dans la Grande guerre: les combattants oubliés: Tome II 1916–1918 [The French Navy during the Great War: The Forgotten Combatants, Book II 1916–1918]. Collection Navires & Histoire des Marines du Mond. Vol. 27. Le Vigen, France: Éditions Lela presse. ISBN 978-2-37468-001-9.
- Roberts, Stephen S. (2021). French Warships in the Age of Steam 1859–1914: Design, Construction, Careers and Fates. Barnsley, UK: Seaforth Publishing. ISBN 978-1-5267-4533-0.
