= French destroyer Fleuret =

At least two ships of the French Navy have been named Fleuret:

- French destroyer Fleuret (1907), a Claymore-class destroyer launched in 1907 and struck in 1920
- French destroyer Fleuret (1938), a Le Hardi-class destroyer launched in 1938, she was renamed Foudroyant in 1941 and scuttled in 1942
