= Cargo liner =

Merchant ship which carries general cargo and passengers

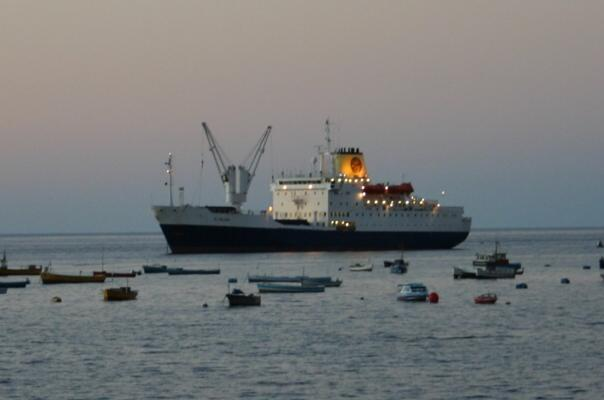
RMS St Helena, one of the last passenger-cargo liners, in James Bay off Saint Helena.

A cargo liner, also known as a passenger-cargo ship or passenger-cargoman, is a type of merchant ship which carries general cargo and often passengers.

After the middle of the 19th century, cargo liners became more common, eventually giving way to container ships and other specialized carriers in the latter half of the 20th century.

== Characteristics ==
A cargo liner has been defined as:

A vessel which operated a regular scheduled service on a fixed route between designated ports and carries many consignments of different commodities.

Cargo liners transported general freight, from raw materials to manufactures to merchandise. Many had cargo holds adapted to particular services, with refrigerator space for frozen meats or chilled fruit, tanks for liquid cargos such as plant oils, and lockers for valuables. Cargo liners typically carried passengers as well, usually in a single class. They differed from ocean liners which focussed on the passenger trade, and from tramp steamers which did not operate on regular schedules. Cargo liners sailed from port to port along routes and on schedules published in advance.

== History ==
The steam-powered cargo liner developed in the mid-19th century with the advancement of technology allowing bigger steamships to be built. As cargo liners were generally faster than tramp cargo ships, they were used for the transport of perishable and high-value goods, as well as providing a passenger service. At first, they were mostly used in Europe and America as well as across the Atlantic Ocean between Europe and America. Longer routes, such as that to Oceania, mainly remained in the hands of sailing ships a little bit longer, due to the inefficiency of the steamship of the time, until the late-1860s when the 1869 opening of the Suez Canal put sailships to disadvantage.

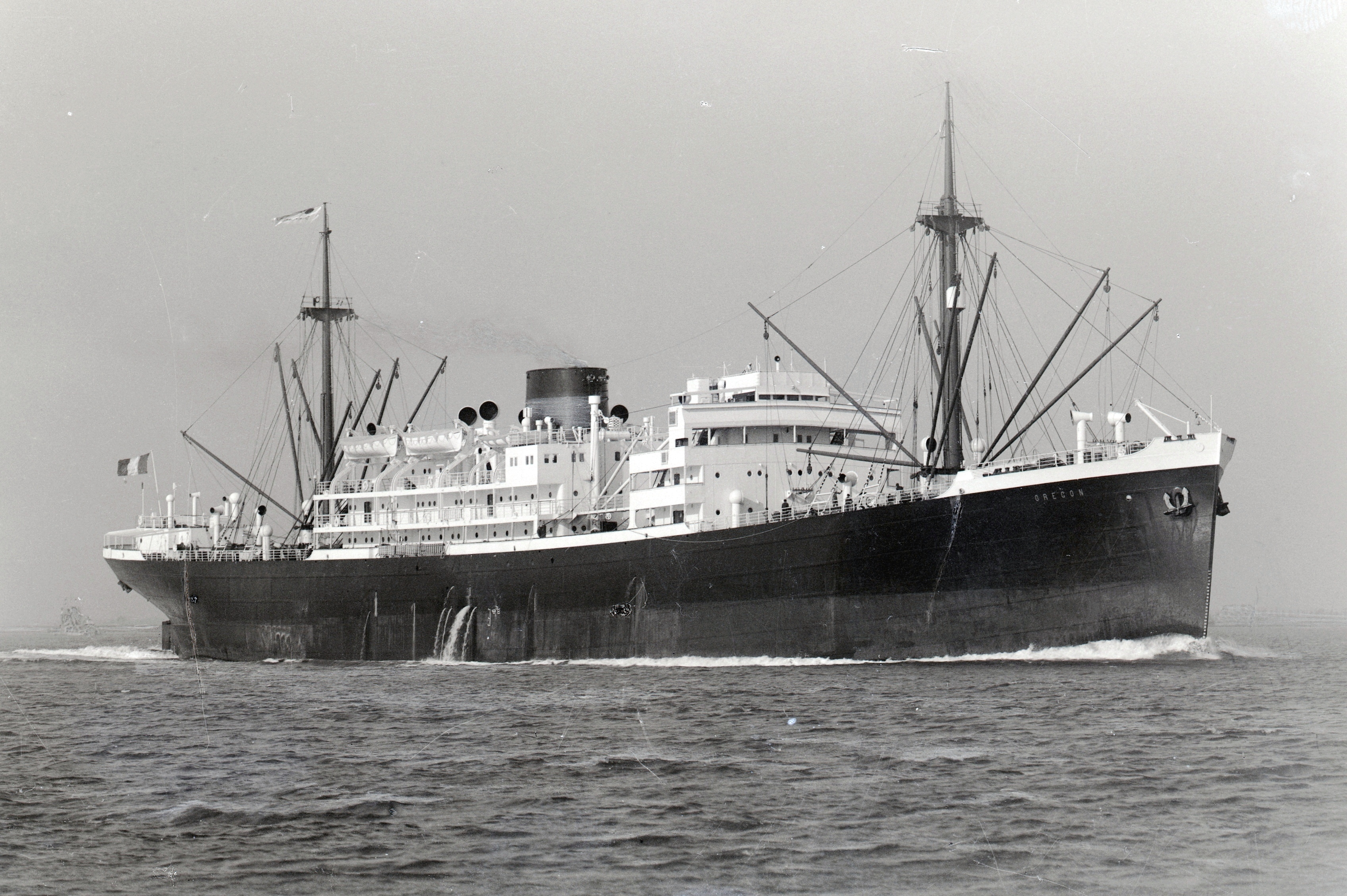
French flag passenger-cargo ship Oregon built in 1929

The use and increased reliability of the compound steam engine gave greater fuel efficiency and opened these routes up to steamships. Alfred Holt pioneered the use of these engines in his steamships. By the last third of the 19th century it was possible for a steamship to carry enough coal to travel 6,000 miles (9,700 km) before needing to refuel. The opening of the Suez Canal in 1869 and the Panama Canal in 1914 also made the use of cargo liners more profitable, and made possible regular scheduled overseas services. Cargo liners soon comprised "the great portion of the British merchant fleet", the largest in the world.

With a focus on high-value freight, most cargo liners carried a limited number of passengers, most commonly 12, as British regulations required a doctor for ships with over 12 passengers.

The decline of the cargo liner came in the 1970s with the introduction of container ships. A surviving example is the Claymore II.

A number of large container vessels still offer a small number of berths to paying passengers. Typically a maximum of 12 passengers are carried as the ship would be legally required to carry a doctor if a greater number were on board. The recreational facilities are those used by the crew and may be limited to a lounge, a gym with exercise equipment and a small swimming pool. Such journeys are of interest to people seeking an unusual travel experience.

== See also ==
- Ro-pax
- Cruiseferry
