= Ardenode =

Ardenode may refer to -

- Ardenode, Alberta, in Canada
- SS Ardenode, a Hong Kong steamship in service 1960-66
