= MV Claymore =

A number of motor vessels that have used the ship prefix M/V have been named Claymore, including:

- MV Claymore II, a passenger-cargo ship, supplying Pitcairn Island from New Zealand and French Polynesia
- MV Claymore (1955), David MacBrayne's last mailboat, serving the Inner Isles between 1955 and 1972
- MV Claymore (1978), a Clyde car and passenger ferry between 1978 and 1997 for Caledonian MacBrayne
- MV Claymore (2024), a roll-on/roll-off vehicle and passenger ferry currently under construction for Caledonian MacBrayne

== See also ==
- Claymore (disambiguation), for other ships
