= Stylet =

Stylet may refer to:

- An archaeological term for a type of flint tool found in Lebanon, also known as a Minet ed Dhalia point
- Stylet (anatomy), a hard, sharp anatomical structure
- In the medical industry a stylet is a slender medical probe or device.
  - For example, stylets used to facilitate tracheal intubation – see Tracheal intubation § Stylets
- French destroyer Stylet, a ship of the French Navy 1905–1921
