= French destroyer Stylet =

Destroyer of the French Navy

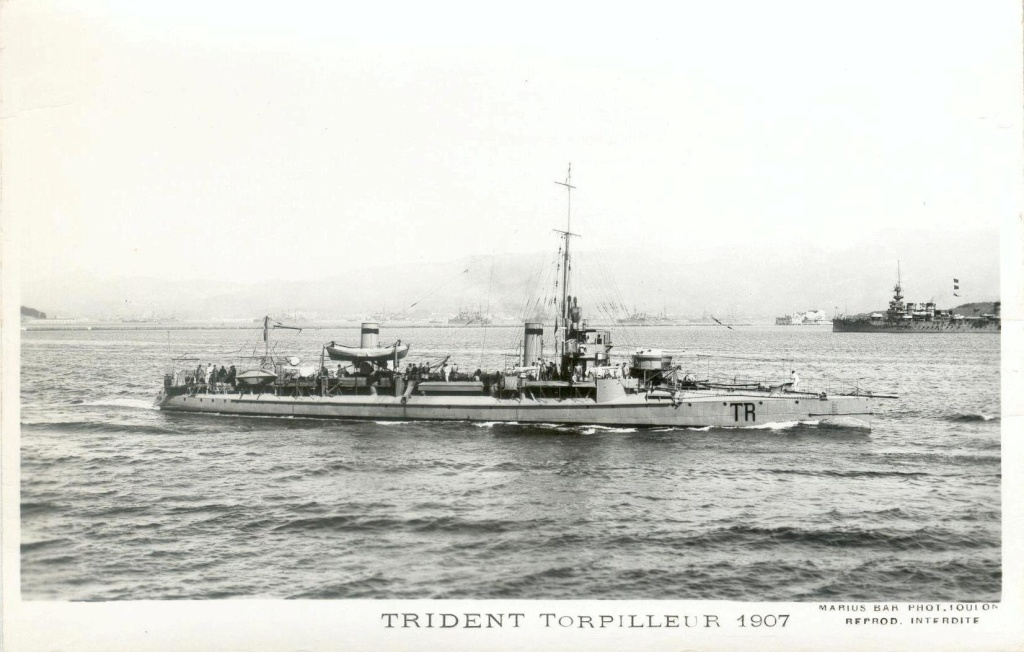
- Sister ship Trident underway in harbor

History

France
- Name: Stylet
- Namesake: Stiletto
- Builder: Arsenal de Rochefort
- Laid down: 21 March 1904
- Launched: 18 May 1905
- Stricken: 14 May 1921

General characteristics
- Class & type: Claymore-class destroyer
- Displacement: 356 t (350 long tons)
- Length: 58 m (190 ft 3 in) (waterline)
- Beam: 6.53 m (21 ft 5 in)
- Draft: 2.95 m (9 ft 8 in)
- Installed power: 2 Normand boilers; 6,800 ihp (5,071 kW)
- Propulsion: 2 shafts; 2 triple-expansion steam engines
- Speed: 28 knots (52 km/h; 32 mph)
- Range: 2,300 nmi (4,300 km; 2,600 mi) at 10 knots (19 km/h; 12 mph)
- Complement: 60
- Armament: 1 × 65 mm (2.6 in) gun; 6 × 47 mm (1.9 in) Hotchkiss guns; 2 × 450 mm (17.7 in) torpedo tubes

Stylet was one of 13 Claymore-class destroyers built for the French Navy in the first decade of the 20th century.

== Construction and career ==
Stylet (Stiletto) was ordered on 12 May 1902 and was laid down at the Arsenal de Rochefort on 21 March 1904. The ship was launched on 18 May 1905 and was assigned to the Northern Squadron after her completion in April 1907. The ship was refitted from May to December and remained with the unit as it was successively redesigned as the Third Squadron (3^{e} Escadre) in March 1908 and 2nd Light Squadron (2^{e} escadre légère) in November 1912. When the First World War began in August 1914, Stylet was assigned to the 2nd Destroyer Flotilla (2^{e} escadrille de torpilleurs) of the based at Cherbourg. The ship was assigned to the Ocean Patrol Flotilla (Escadrille de patrouille de l'Océan) in 1916 and was transferred to the Brittany Patrol Division (Division des patrouilleurs de Bretagne) the following year and remained with that unit until the end of the war in 1918. Stylet was struck from the naval register on 14 May 1921 and sold for scrap on 12 August.

== Bibliography ==
- Campbell, N. J. M. (1979). "France". In Chesneau, Roger & Kolesnik, Eugene M. (eds.). Conway's All the World's Fighting Ships 1860–1905. Greenwich: Conway Maritime Press. pp. 283–333. ISBN 0-8317-0302-4.
- Couhat, Jean Labayle (1974). French Warships of World War I. London: Ian Allan. ISBN 0-7110-0445-5.
- Le Masson, Henri (1967). Histoire du Torpilleur en France [History of the Torpedo-armed Ship in France]. Paris: Académie de marine. OCLC 491016784.
- Prévoteaux, Gérard (2017). La marine française dans la Grande guerre: les combattants oubliés: Tome I 1914–1915 [The French Navy during the Great War: The Forgotten Combatants, Book I 1914–1915]. Collection Navires & Histoire des Marines du Mond. Vol. 23. Le Vigen, France: Éditions Lela presse. ISBN 978-2-37468-000-2.
- Prévoteaux, Gérard (2017). La marine française dans la Grande guerre: les combattants oubliés: Tome II 1916–1918 [The French Navy during the Great War: The Forgotten Combatants, Book II 1916–1918]. Collection Navires & Histoire des Marines du Mond. Vol. 27. Le Vigen, France: Éditions Lela presse. ISBN 978-2-37468-001-9.
- Roberts, Stephen S. (2021). French Warships in the Age of Steam 1859–1914: Design, Construction, Careers and Fates. Barnsley, UK: Seaforth Publishing. ISBN 978-1-5267-4533-0.
