= French destroyer Voltigeur =

Destroyer of the French Navy

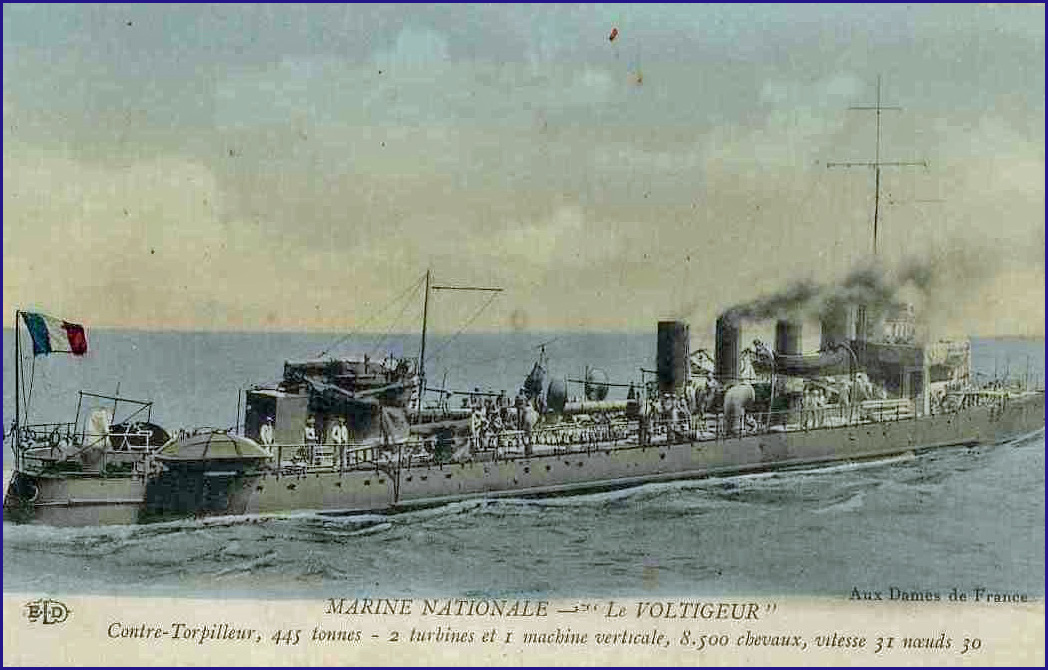
- A lithograph of Voltigeur

History

France
- Name: Voltigeur
- Namesake: Voltigeur
- Builder: Ateliers et Chantiers de Bretagne, Nantes
- Launched: 23 March 1909
- Completed: April 1910
- Stricken: May 1920

General characteristics
- Class & type: Voltigeur-class destroyer
- Displacement: 457 t (450 long tons) (designed); 599 t (590 long tons) (deep load)
- Length: 65.5 m (214 ft 11 in) (p/p)
- Beam: 6.8 m (22 ft 4 in)
- Draft: 3.1 m (10 ft 2 in)
- Installed power: 7,500 shp (5,593 kW); 4 Normand boilers
- Propulsion: 3 shafts; 1 Triple-expansion steam engine and 2 steam turbines
- Speed: 28 knots (52 km/h; 32 mph)
- Range: 1,520 nmi (2,820 km; 1,750 mi) at 10 knots (19 km/h; 12 mph)
- Complement: 76–77
- Armament: 6 × single 65 mm (2.6 in) guns; 3 × 450 mm (17.7 in) torpedo tubes

Voltigeur was the name ship of her class of destroyers built for the French Navy in the first decade of the 20th century.

== Design and description ==
The Voltigeur class was based on the preceding Spahi-class destroyer, albeit with a different arrangement of propulsion machinery. Voltigeur had a length between perpendiculars of 65.5 meters (214 ft 11 in), a beam of 6.8 meters (22 ft 4 in), and a draft of 3.1 meters (10 ft 2 in). Designed to displaced 450 metric tons (443 long tons), the ships displaced 590 t (581 long tons) at deep load. Their crew numbered 76–77 men.

Voltigeur was powered by one triple-expansion steam engine and two Rateau direct-drive steam turbines. The steam engine drove the center propeller shaft while the turbines powered the two outer shafts, all using steam provided by four Normand boilers. The engines were designed to produce 7,500 indicated horsepower (5,600 kW) which was intended to give the ships a speed of 28 knots (52 km/h; 32 mph). The ships carried enough coal to give them a range of 1,520 nautical miles (2,820 km; 1,750 mi) at a cruising speed of 10 knots (19 km/h; 12 mph).

The primary armament of the Voltigeur-class ships consisted of six 65-millimeter (2.6 in) Modèle 1902 guns in single mounts, one each fore and aft of the superstructure and the others were distributed amidships. They were also fitted with three 450-millimeter (17.7 in) torpedo tubes. One of these was in a fixed mount in the bow and the other two were on single rotating mounts amidships.

== Construction and career ==
Voltigeur was ordered from Ateliers et Chantiers de Bretagne and was launched from its Nantes shipyard on 23 March 1909. The ship was completed in April 1910. When the First World War began in August 1914, Voltigeur was assigned to the 3rd Destroyer Flotilla (3^{e} escadrille de torpilleurs) of the 1st Naval Army (1^{ère} Armée Navale). During the preliminary stages of the Battle of Antivari on 16 August, the 1st, 4th and 5th Destroyer Flotillas were tasked to escort the core of the 1st Naval Army while the 2nd, 3rd and 6th Flotillas escorted the armored cruisers of the 2nd Light Squadron (2^{e} escadre légère) and two British cruisers. After reuniting both groups and spotting the Austro-Hungarian protected cruiser SMS Zenta and the destroyer SMS Ulan, the French destroyers played no role in sinking the cruiser, although the 4th Flotilla was sent on an unsuccessful pursuit of Ulan. Having broken the Austro-Hungarian blockade of Antivari (now known as Bar), Vice-Admiral (Vice-amiral) Augustin Boué de Lapeyrère, commander of the 1st Naval Army, decided to ferry troops and supplies to the port, escorted by the 2nd Light Squadron and the 1st and 6th Destroyer Flotillas while the rest of the 1st Naval Army bombarded the Austro-Hungarian naval base at Cattaro, Montenegro, on 1 September. Four days later, the fleet covered the evacuation of Danilo, Crown Prince of Montenegro to the Greek island of Corfu. The flotilla escorted multiple small convoys loaded with supplies and equipment to Antivari, beginning in October and lasting for the rest of the year, always covered by the larger ships of the Naval Army in futile attempts to lure the Austro-Hungarian fleet into battle.

The torpedoing of the French battleship Jean Bart on 21 December caused a change in French tactics as the battleships were too important to risk to submarine attack. Henceforth, only the destroyers would escort the transports. According to a British report of 5 June, Voltigeur and the destroyers Mousqueton and Hache were assigned to patrol the area around Cape Matapan, Greece. After Italy signed the Treaty of London and declared war on the Austro-Hungarian Empire on 23 May 1915, Boué de Lapeyrère reorganized his forces in late June to cover the approaches to the Adriatic and interdict merchant shipping of the Central Powers since the Royal Italian Navy (Regia Marina) now had primary responsibility for the Adriatic itself. His area of responsibility extended from Sardinia to Crete and he divided it into two zones with the 1st Light Squadron assigned to the western zone and the 2nd Light Squadron in the east. Those destroyers of the 1st Naval Army not assigned to reinforce the Italians were transferred to the newly formed 1st and 2nd Flotillas of the Naval Army (flotille d'Armée navale). The 1st and 3rd Destroyer Flotillas were assigned to the 2nd Flotilla of the Naval Army, of which the destroyer Dehorter was the flagship, which was tasked to support the cruisers of the 2nd Light Division.

== Bibliography ==
- Couhat, Jean Labayle (1974). French Warships of World War I. London: Ian Allan. ISBN 0-7110-0445-5.
- Freivogel, Zvonimir (2019). The Great War in the Adriatic Sea 1914–1918. Zagreb: Despot Infinitus. ISBN 978-953-8218-40-8.
- Jordan, John & Caresse, Philippe (2019). French Armoured Cruisers 1887–1932. Barnsley, UK: Seaforth Publishing. ISBN 978-1-5267-4118-9.
- Monograph No. 21: The Mediterranean 1914–1915 (PDF). Naval Staff Monographs (Historical). Vol. VIII. The Naval Staff, Training and Staff Duties Division. 1923.
- Prévoteaux, Gérard (2017). La marine française dans la Grande guerre: les combattants oubliés: Tome I 1914–1915 [The French Navy during the Great War: The Forgotten Combatants, Book I 1914–1915]. Collection Navires & Histoire des Marines du Mond. Vol. 23. Le Vigen, France: Éditions Lela presse. ISBN 978-2-37468-000-2.
- Prévoteaux, Gérard (2017). La marine française dans la Grande guerre: les combattants oubliés: Tome II 1916–1918 [The French Navy during the Great War: The Forgotten Combatants, Book II 1916–1918]. Collection Navires & Histoire des Marines du Mond. Vol. 27. Le Vigen, France: Éditions Lela presse. ISBN 978-2-37468-001-9.
- Roberts, Stephen S. (2021). French Warships in the Age of Steam 1859–1914: Design, Construction, Careers and Fates. Barnsley, UK: Seaforth Publishing. ISBN 978-1-5267-4533-0.
- Smigielski, Adam (1985). "France". In Gray, Randal (ed.). Conway's All the World's Fighting Ships 1906–1921. Annapolis, Maryland: Naval Institute Press. pp. 190–220. ISBN 0-87021-907-3.
