= French destroyer Obusier =

Destroyer of the French Navy

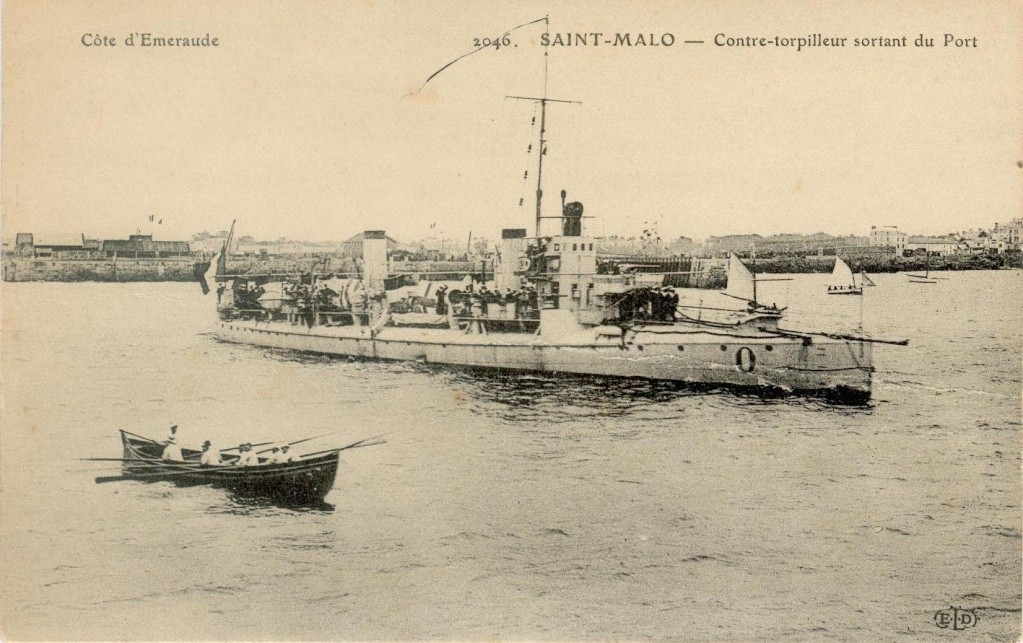
- Obusier in Saint-Malo

History

France
- Name: Obusier
- Namesake: Howitzer
- Builder: Arsenal de Rochefort
- Laid down: 10 May 1904
- Launched: 9 March 1905
- Stricken: 27 May 1921

General characteristics
- Class & type: Claymore-class destroyer
- Displacement: 356 t (350 long tons)
- Length: 58 m (190 ft 3 in) (waterline)
- Beam: 6.53 m (21 ft 5 in)
- Draft: 2.95 m (9 ft 8 in)
- Installed power: 2 Normand boilers; 6,800 ihp (5,071 kW)
- Propulsion: 2 shafts; 2 triple-expansion steam engines
- Speed: 28 knots (52 km/h; 32 mph)
- Range: 2,300 nmi (4,300 km; 2,600 mi) at 10 knots (19 km/h; 12 mph)
- Complement: 60
- Armament: 1 × 65 mm (2.6 in) gun; 6 × 47 mm (1.9 in) Hotchkiss guns; 2 × 450 mm (17.7 in) torpedo tubes

Obusier was one of 13 Claymore-class destroyers built for the French Navy in the first decade of the 20th century.

== Construction and career ==
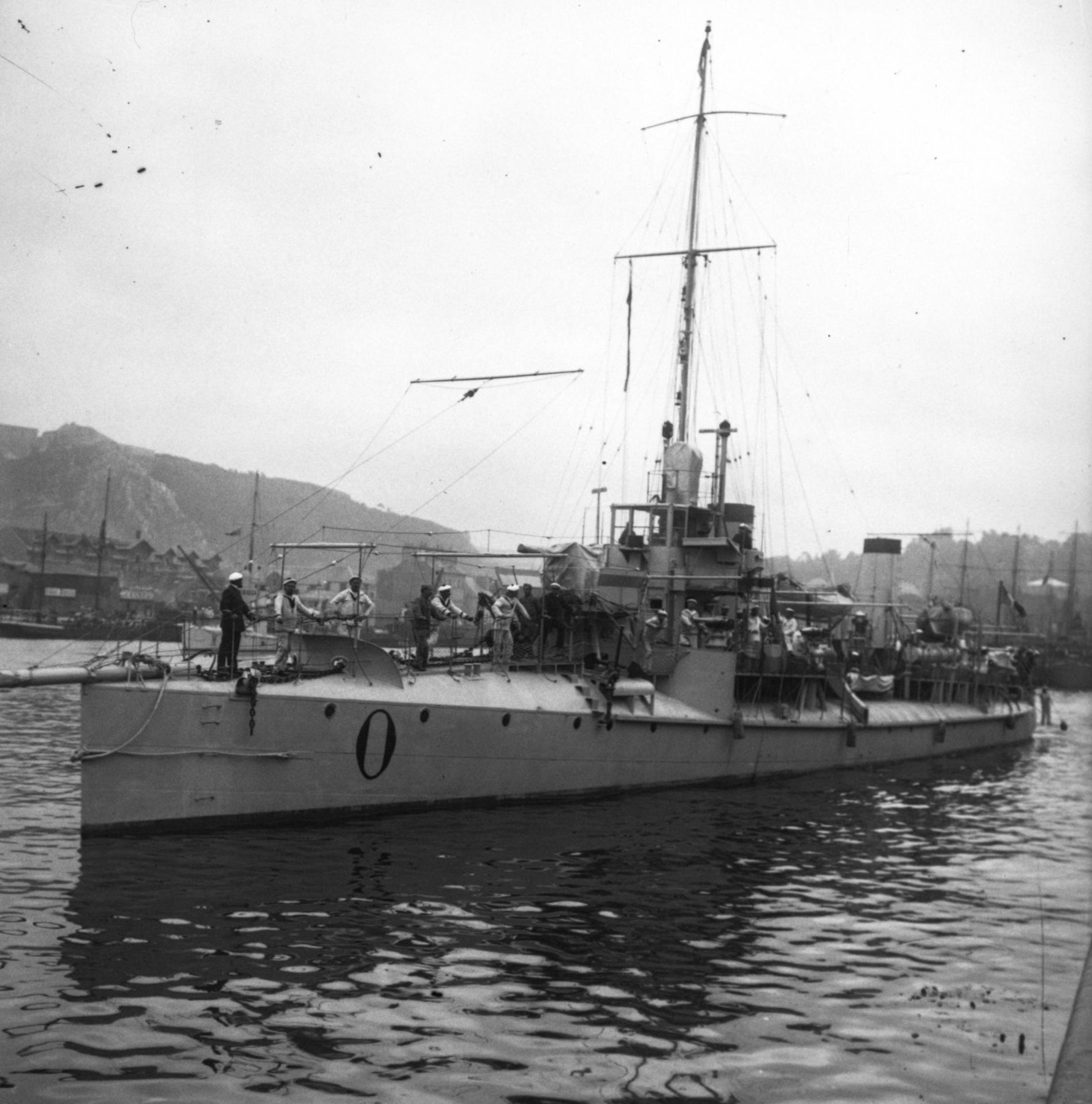
Obusier in Cherbourg, July 1909

Obusier was ordered on 5 August 1903 and was laid down at the Arsenal de Rochefort on 10 May 1904. The ship was launched on 9 March 1906 and was assigned to the Northern Squadron after her completion in October 1907. She was transferred to the Rochefort Local Defenses (Défense mobile de Rochefort) in January 1910 and immediately began a lengthy refit that lasted until August 1912 when she was reassigned to the Brest Local Defenses. She remained with the unit until November when she was transferred to the Third Squadron (3^{e} Escadre), as the Northern Squadron had been redesignated while she was under repair. Obusier was assigned to the 1st Destroyer Flotilla (1^{re} escadrille de torpilleurs) of the 2nd Light Squadron (2^{e} escadre légère) in August 1913 and was refitted from December 1913 to June 1914 at Rochefort. The ship was transferred to the North Sea Squadron (Flotille de la mer du Nord), based at Dunkerque, in October 1915. She had her stern blown off by a naval mine on 24 May 1916. Obusier was placed in reserve in May 1919, struck from the naval register on 27 May 1921 and sold for scrap on 6 March 1922.

== Bibliography ==
- Campbell, N. J. M. (1979). "France". In Chesneau, Roger & Kolesnik, Eugene M. (eds.). Conway's All the World's Fighting Ships 1860–1905. Greenwich: Conway Maritime Press. pp. 283–333. ISBN 0-8317-0302-4.
- Couhat, Jean Labayle (1974). French Warships of World War I. London: Ian Allan. ISBN 0-7110-0445-5.
- Le Masson, Henri (1967). Histoire du Torpilleur en France [History of the Torpedo-armed Ship in France]. Paris: Académie de marine. OCLC 491016784.
- Prévoteaux, Gérard (2017). La marine française dans la Grande guerre: les combattants oubliés: Tome I 1914–1915 [The French Navy during the Great War: The Forgotten Combatants, Book I 1914–1915]. Collection Navires & Histoire des Marines du Mond. Vol. 23. Le Vigen, France: Éditions Lela presse. ISBN 978-2-37468-000-2.
- Prévoteaux, Gérard (2017). La marine française dans la Grande guerre: les combattants oubliés: Tome II 1916–1918 [The French Navy during the Great War: The Forgotten Combatants, Book II 1916–1918]. Collection Navires & Histoire des Marines du Mond. Vol. 27. Le Vigen, France: Éditions Lela presse. ISBN 978-2-37468-001-9.
- Roberts, Stephen S. (2021). French Warships in the Age of Steam 1859–1914: Design, Construction, Careers and Fates. Barnsley, UK: Seaforth Publishing. ISBN 978-1-5267-4533-0.
