= Claymore Creek =

Stream in South Dakota, U.S.

Coordinates: 45°34′54″N 100°30′01″W

Claymore Creek is a stream in the U.S. state of South Dakota.

Claymore Creek has the name of Basil Claymore, a pioneer settler.

== See also ==
- List of rivers of South Dakota
