= French destroyer Fleuret (1907) =

Destroyer of the French Navy

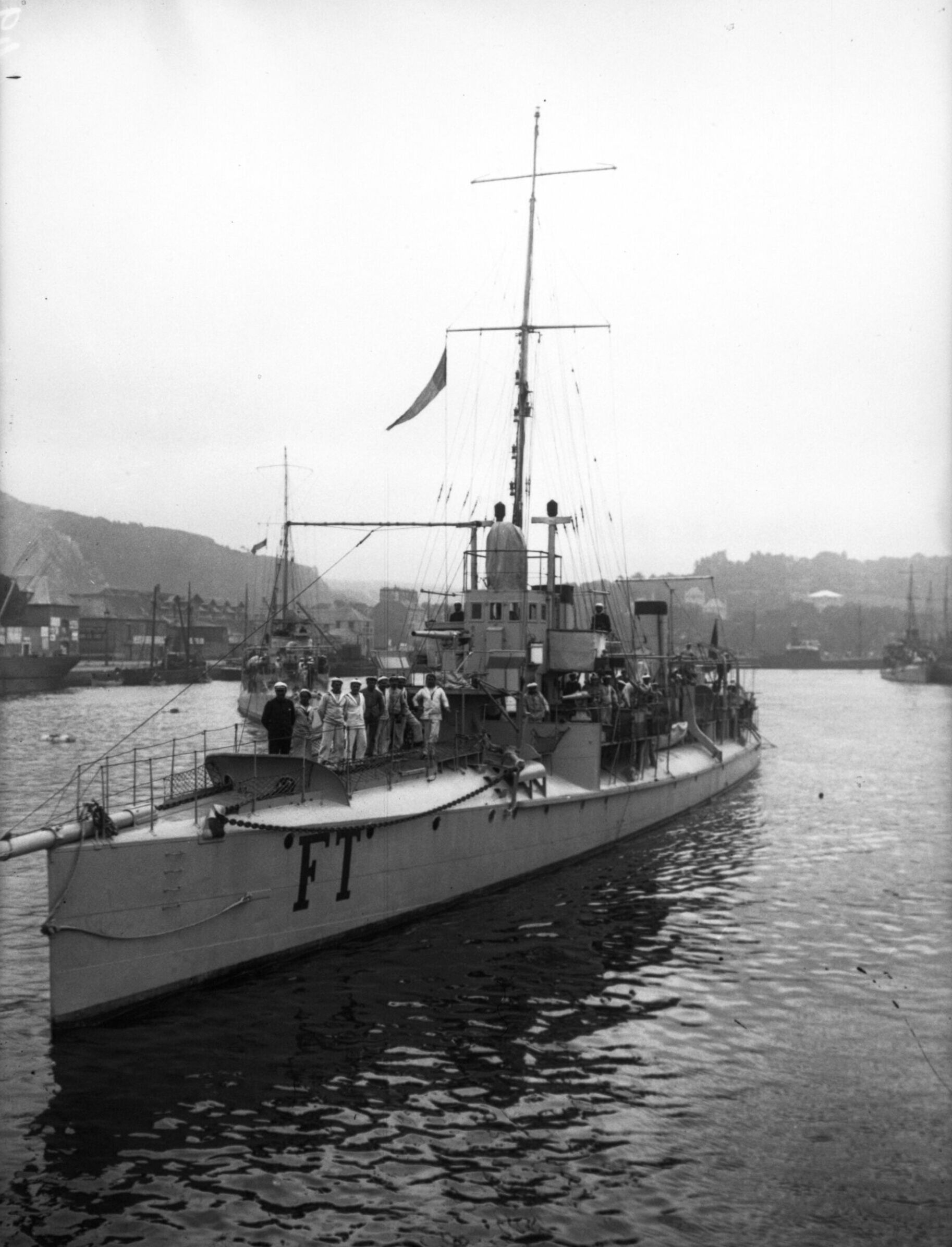
- Fleuret in Cherbourg in 1909

History

France
- Name: Fleuret
- Namesake: Foil
- Builder: Arsenal de Rochefort
- Laid down: May 1905
- Launched: 14 December 1907
- Stricken: 12 January 1920

General characteristics
- Class & type: Claymore-class destroyer
- Displacement: 356 t (350 long tons)
- Length: 58 m (190 ft 3 in) (waterline)
- Beam: 6.53 m (21 ft 5 in)
- Draft: 2.95 m (9 ft 8 in)
- Installed power: 2 Normand boilers; 6,800 ihp (5,071 kW)
- Propulsion: 2 shafts; 2 triple-expansion steam engines
- Speed: 28 knots (52 km/h; 32 mph)
- Range: 2,300 nmi (4,300 km; 2,600 mi) at 10 knots (19 km/h; 12 mph)
- Complement: 60
- Armament: 1 × 65 mm (2.6 in) gun; 6 × 47 mm (1.9 in) Hotchkiss guns; 2 × 450 mm (17.7 in) torpedo tubes

Fleuret was one of 13 Claymore-class destroyers built for the French Navy in the first decade of the 20th century.

== Construction and career ==
Fleuret was ordered on 5 May 1905 and was laid down at the Arsenal de Rochefort in 1906. The ship was launched on 14 December 1906 and was assigned to the Northern Squadron after her completion in March 1908. She remained with the unit as it was successively redesigned as the Third Squadron (3^{e} Escadre) in 1910 and was assigned to the 2nd Destroyer Flotilla (2^{e} escadrille de torpilleurs) when the Third Squadron was reorganized and renamed the 2nd Light Squadron (2^{e} escadre légère) in November 1912.

When the First World War began in August 1914, Fleuret was still assigned to the 2nd Destroyer Flotilla based at Brest and remained with that unit until mid-1915. She was transferred to the North Sea Flotilla (Flotille de la mer du Nord), based at Dunkerque, the following year. In February 1916, the ship was badly damaged in a collision with the destroyer Aventurier and was under repair at Le Havre until November. Fleuret was assigned to the Normandy Patrol Boat Division (Division des patrouilleurs de Normandie) at Cherbourg in 1918. The ship was struck from the naval register on 12 January 1920 and served as a towed target from January 1921 until her sinking in 1923.

== Bibliography ==
- Campbell, N. J. M. (1979). "France". In Chesneau, Roger & Kolesnik, Eugene M. (eds.). Conway's All the World's Fighting Ships 1860–1905. Greenwich: Conway Maritime Press. pp. 283–333. ISBN 0-8317-0302-4.
- Couhat, Jean Labayle (1974). French Warships of World War I. London: Ian Allan. ISBN 0-7110-0445-5.
- Le Masson, Henri (1967). Histoire du Torpilleur en France [History of the Torpedo-armed Ship in France]. Paris: Académie de marine. OCLC 491016784.
- Prévoteaux, Gérard (2017). La marine française dans la Grande guerre: les combattants oubliés: Tome I 1914–1915 [The French Navy during the Great War: The Forgotten Combatants, Book I 1914–1915]. Collection Navires & Histoire des Marines du Mond. Vol. 23. Le Vigen, France: Éditions Lela presse. ISBN 978-2-37468-000-2.
- Prévoteaux, Gérard (2017). La marine française dans la Grande guerre: les combattants oubliés: Tome II 1916–1918 [The French Navy during the Great War: The Forgotten Combatants, Book II 1916–1918]. Collection Navires & Histoire des Marines du Mond. Vol. 27. Le Vigen, France: Éditions Lela presse. ISBN 978-2-37468-001-9.
- Roberts, Stephen S. (2021). French Warships in the Age of Steam 1859–1914: Design, Construction, Careers and Fates. Barnsley, UK: Seaforth Publishing. ISBN 978-1-5267-4533-0.
- Roche, Jean-Michel (2005). Dictionnaire des bâtiments de la flotte de guerre française de Colbert à nos jours [Dictionary of French Warships from Colbert to the Present Day]. Vol. II: 1870–2006. Group Retozel-Maury Millau. ISBN 978-2-9525917-0-6. OCLC 165892922.
