= French destroyer Claymore =

Destroyer of the French Navy

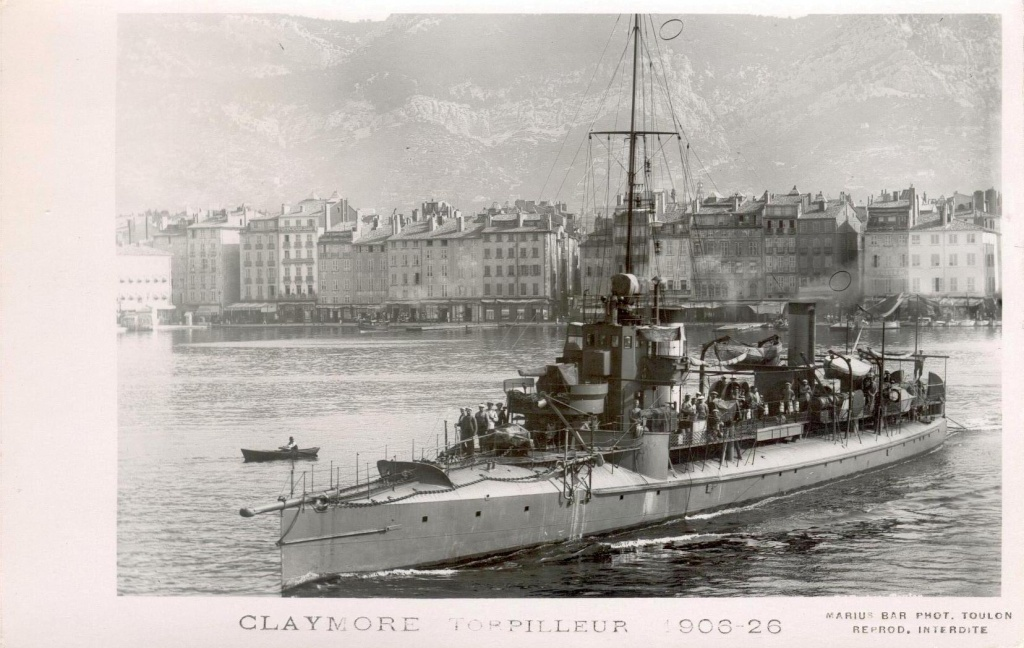
- Claymore underway in harbor

History

France
- Name: Claymore
- Namesake: Claymore
- Builder: Chantiers et Ateliers Augustin Normand, Le Havre
- Laid down: 1904
- Launched: 14 March 1906
- Stricken: 19 March 1926

General characteristics
- Class & type: Claymore-class destroyer
- Displacement: 356 t (350 long tons)
- Length: 58 m (190 ft 3 in) (waterline)
- Beam: 6.53 m (21 ft 5 in)
- Draft: 2.95 m (9 ft 8 in)
- Installed power: 2 Normand boilers; 6,800 ihp (5,071 kW)
- Propulsion: 2 shafts; 2 triple-expansion steam engines
- Speed: 28 knots (52 km/h; 32 mph)
- Range: 2,300 nmi (4,300 km; 2,600 mi) at 10 knots (19 km/h; 12 mph)
- Complement: 60
- Armament: 1 × 65 mm (2.6 in) gun; 6 × 47 mm (1.9 in) Hotchkiss guns; 2 × 450 mm (17.7 in) torpedo tubes

Claymore was the name ship of her class of destroyers built for the French Navy in the first decade of the 20th century.

== Construction and career ==
Claymore (Claymore) was ordered on 2 September 1903 from Chantiers et Ateliers Augustin Normand and was laid down at its Le Havre shipyard in 1904. The ship was launched on 14 March 1906 and was assigned to the Mediterranean Squadron (Escadre de la Méditerranée) after her completion in August 1906. She was transferred to the Brest Destroyer Squadron (Torpilleurs de Brest) in September 1910 and was refitted as a light minesweeper to test the Ronar'ch minesweeping gear Claymore was reassigned to the 2nd Destroyer Flotilla (2^{e} Escadrille de torpilleurs d'escadre) of the Third Squadron (3^{e} Escadre) in July 1912 and remained with the unit when it was redesigned as the 2nd Light Squadron (2^{e} escadre légère).

The ship remained with the 2nd Destroyer Flotilla until mid-1915. She was assigned to the Brittany Patrol Boat Division (Division des patrouilleurs de Bretagne) during 1916–1918. Claymore served as the flagship of the commander of the division detached to the Baltic (chef de division des bâtiments détachés en Baltique) in January 1920. She served in the Atlantic Flotilla (Flotille de l'Atlantique) at Brest in 1922–1924 and was disarmed on 4 June 1925. The ship was condemned on 19 March 1926 and was attached to the school for engineer cadets (École des ingénieurs mécaniciens). Her engines and boilers were removed the following year to serve as training aids and her hull was sold for scrap on 24 April 1928.

== Bibliography ==
- Campbell, N. J. M. (1979). "France". In Chesneau, Roger & Kolesnik, Eugene M. (eds.). Conway's All the World's Fighting Ships 1860–1905. Greenwich: Conway Maritime Press. pp. 283–333. ISBN 0-8317-0302-4.
- Couhat, Jean Labayle (1974). French Warships of World War I. London: Ian Allan. ISBN 0-7110-0445-5.
- Le Masson, Henri (1967). Histoire du Torpilleur en France [History of the Torpedo-armed Ship in France]. Paris: Académie de marine. OCLC 491016784.
- Prévoteaux, Gérard (2017). La marine française dans la Grande guerre: les combattants oubliés: Tome I 1914–1915 [The French Navy during the Great War: The Forgotten Combatants, Book I 1914–1915]. Collection Navires & Histoire des Marines du Mond. Vol. 23. Le Vigen, France: Éditions Lela presse. ISBN 978-2-37468-000-2.
- Prévoteaux, Gérard (2017). La marine française dans la Grande guerre: les combattants oubliés: Tome II 1916–1918 [The French Navy during the Great War: The Forgotten Combatants, Book II 1916–1918]. Collection Navires & Histoire des Marines du Mond. Vol. 27. Le Vigen, France: Éditions Lela presse. ISBN 978-2-37468-001-9.
- Roberts, Stephen S. (2021). French Warships in the Age of Steam 1859–1914: Design, Construction, Careers and Fates. Barnsley, UK: Seaforth Publishing. ISBN 978-1-5267-4533-0.
