= SS Belgian Crew =

Cargo ship

History
- Name: Empire Claymore (1942–43); Belgian Crew (1943–46); Capitaine Parlet (1946–60); Ardenode (1960–66); Tynlee (1966–69)
- Owner: Ministry of War Transport (1942–43); Belgian Government (1943–46); Compagnie Maritime Belge (1946–60); Mullion & Co (1960–66); Tynlee Navigation Co (1966–69)
- Operator: Lyle Shipping Co Ltd (1942–43); Belgian Government (1943–46); Compagnie Maritime Belge (1946–60); Mullion & Co (1960–66); Tynlee Navigation Co (1966–69)
- Port of registry: (United Kingdom) Newcastle upon Tyne (1942–43); (Belgium) Antwerp (1943–60); Hong Kong (1960–66); Panama City (1966–69)
- Builder: Sir W G Armstrong, Whitworth & Co (Shipbuilders) Ltd
- Launched: 19 November 1942
- Completed: January 1943
- Identification: Code Letters BFDK (1942–43); Code Letters ONVV (1943–60); United Kingdom Official Number 165852 (1942–43)
- Fate: Scrapped

General characteristics
- Type: Cargo ship
- Tonnage: 7,048 GRT; 5,028 NRT; 10,300 DWT
- Length: 430 ft 9 in (131.29 m)
- Beam: 56 ft 2 in (17.12 m)
- Depth: 35 ft 2 in (10.72 m)
- Installed power: Triple expansion steam engine
- Propulsion: Screw propeller

Belgian Crew was a 7,048 GRT cargo ship which was built in 1942 by Sir W G Armstrong, Whitworth & Co (Shipbuilders) Ltd, Newcastle upon Tyne as Empire Claymore for the Ministry of War Transport (MoWT). She was transferred to the Belgian Government in 1943 and renamed Belgian Crew. In 1946 she was sold to Compagnie Maritime Belge and renamed Capitaine Parlet. In 1960 she was sold to Hong Kong and renamed Ardenode. A further sale to Panama in 1966 resulted in her being renamed Tynlee. She served until 1969, when she was scrapped.

== Description ==
The ship was built by Sir W G Armstrong, Whitworth & Co (Shipbuilders) Ltd, Newcastle upon Tyne. She was launched on 19 November 1942 and completed in January 1943.

The ship was 430 feet 9 inches (131.29 m) long, with a beam of 56 feet 2 inches (17.12 m) and a depth of 35 feet 2 inches (10.72 m). She had a GRT of 7,031 and a NRT of 4,916, with a DWT of 10,300.

The ship was propelled by a triple expansion steam engine, which had cylinders of 24 1/2 inches (62 cm), 39 inches (99 cm) and 70 inches (180 cm) diameter by 48 inches (120 cm) stroke. The engine was built by the Central Marine Engine Works, West Hartlepool.

== History ==
Empire Claymore was built for the MoWT. She was placed under the management of Lyle Shipping Co Ltd. Her port of registry was Newcastle upon Tyne. The Code Letters BFDK and United Kingdom Official Number 165852 were allocated.

Empire Claymore was a member of a number of convoys during the Second World War.

HX 240

Convoy HX 240 departed from New York on 19 May 1943 and arrived at Liverpool on 4 June. Empire Claymore joined the convoy at Halifax, Nova Scotia on 21 May. She was carrying a cargo of grain bound for London.

On 21 June 1943, Empire Claymore was transferred to the Belgian Government and was renamed Belgian Crew. Her port of registry was changed to Antwerp and her Code Letters were changed to ONVV, no Official Number being allocated. She was placed under the management of Agence Maritime Internationale SA.

Belgian Crew was a member of a number of convoys during the Second World War.

HX 251

Convoy HX 251 departed New York on 7 August 1943 and arrived at Liverpool on 23 August. Belgian Crew was carrying a cargo of steel and lumber bound for Immingham, Lincolnshire. She had originally been due to sail in Convoy HX 250.

HX 292

Convoy HX 292 departed New York on 19 May 1944 and arrived at Liverpool on 2 June. Belgian Crew was carrying a cargo of grain. She had departed from Sydney, Cape Breton and was bound for Barry Docks, Glamorgan.

In 1946, Belgian Crew was sold to the Compagnie Maritime Belge SA and renamed Capitaine Parlet. She served until 1960 when she was sold to Mullion & Co, Hong Kong and renamed Ardenode. In 1966, she was sold to Tynlee Navigation Co, Panama and was renamed Tynlee. She served until 1969, arriving at Kaohsiung, Taiwan in July 1969 for scrapping.
