= YWAM Koha =

New Zealand-registered medical aid ship

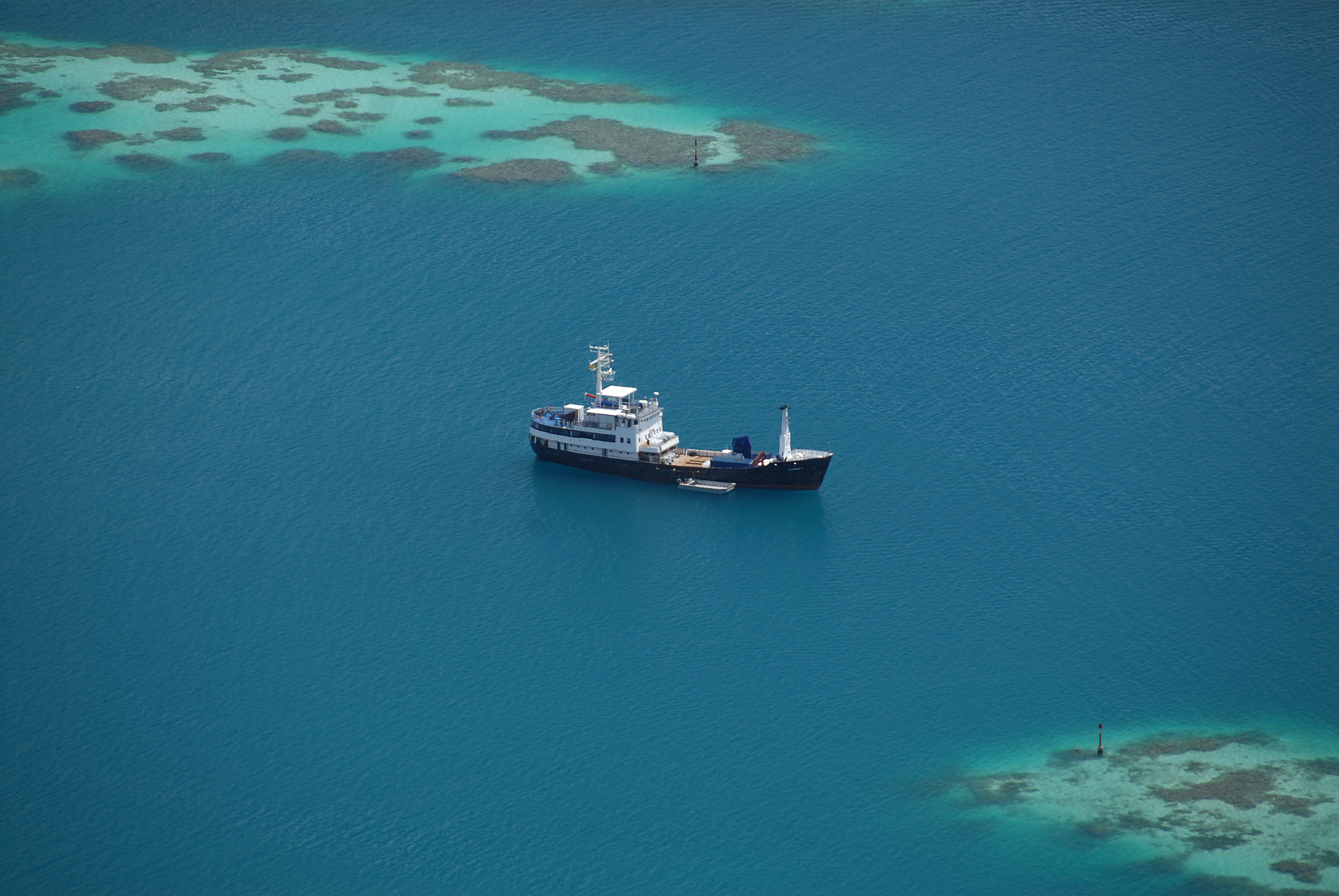

History
- Name: 1968-1998: Konrad Meisel; 1998-2010: Isibane; 2010-2019: Claymore II; 2019-Onwards: YWAM Koha
- Owner: 1968-1998: Federal Republic of Germany; 1998-2004: Republic of South Africa; 2004-2010: Zonnekus Mansion Pty Ltd, Milnerton, South Africa; 2010-2019: Stoney Creek Shipping Co Ltd, Palmerston North, New Zealand; 2019-Onwards: YWAM Ships Aotearoa
- Port of registry: 1968-1990: Hamburg, West Germany; 1990-1998: Hamburg, Germany; c2000-2004: South Africa; 2004-2010: Panama; from 2010: Tauranga, New Zealand
- Builder: Jadewerft, Wilhelmshaven
- Yard number: 113
- Completed: 1968
- Identification: IMO number: 6815691; from 2010: MNZ# 133693; MMSI number: 512150000; Call sign: ZMG2228

General characteristics
- Type: Buoy tender; from c2004 passenger and cargo, from 2019 Medical Ship
- Tonnage: 514 GRT, later 486 GT
- Length: 160 ft (49 m)
- Beam: 32 ft (9.8 m)
- Draft: 12 ft (3.7 m)
- Decks: 5
- Installed power: Two Deutz diesel engines, 560 kW (750 hp) each
- Propulsion: Single shaft; controllable-pitch propeller; KaMeWa bow thruster (180 hp)
- Speed: 14 knots (26 km/h; 16 mph) (maximum); 9.5 knots (17.6 km/h; 10.9 mph) (cruise)
- Range: 9,000 nautical miles (17,000 km; 10,000 mi)
- Capacity: 12 passengers
- Crew: 8

YWAM Koha is a New Zealand-registered Medical Aid Ship, built in 1968 as the buoy tender Konrad Meisel for the German Government and later owned in South Africa as Isibane. As the Claymore II she provided the essential transport links to the remote Pacific territory of Pitcairn Island from New Zealand and French Polynesia, part-funded by the British Government until 2018 when she was replaced by the Silver Supporter.

== Buoy tender ==
Konrad Meisel was built in 1968 (Note: 1966 in some sources is erroneous) by Jadewerft Wilhelmshaven GmbH, Wilhelmshaven for the Wasser- und Schifffahrtsamt Cuxhaven (Waterways and Shipping Office Cuxhaven) of the Federal Republic of Germany. When built, she measured 514 gross register tons with dimensions of 48.82m LOA, 44.30m LBP, 9.56m beam and 4.65m depth, and a draught of 3.25m. She was powered by two Deutz 8-cylinder diesel engines, totalling 1103 kW (1500 bhp), geared to a single propeller. Over the single hold an eleven-ton crane was installed.

During Konrad Meisel's 30-year service with WSA Cuxhaven, she was responsible for the maintenance of marine navigation buoys in the lower River Elbe and the adjacent sea areas. In 1998 the ship was retired by the WSA Cuxhaven and sold to the South African Government.

The tender was allocated to the South African Maritime Safety Authority and renamed Isibane, Zulu for 'light', by which time she had been remeasured as 486 gross tons. In 2004 she was sold to South African company Zonnekus Mansion Pty Ltd and transferred to the Panamanian flag.

== Passenger-cargo vessel ==
In August 2009 Isibane was purchased by Nigel Jolly, of Stoney Creek Shipping Co Ltd, Palmerston North, New Zealand, modified to carry cargo and 12 passengers, and renamed Claymore II. Stoney Creek Shipping had been providing a passenger and cargo link to Pitcairn at the request of the British Government since 2002 with Braveheart, a former Japanese fishery research ship.

Claymore II was contracted by the Pitcairn Island Council, and subsidised by the British Government, to make four annual round trips to deliver cargo and supplies to Pitcairn Island from New Zealand, loading at Tauranga. She also made eight subsidised round trips each year, from Pitcairn to Mangareva, French Polynesia, the nearest airport, for passengers to connect to the air service to Tahiti. Outside these scheduled services, the vessel was available for charter. As Pitcairn has no port facilities, all cargo and passengers were landed on the island from Claymore II by longboat. As of 2014, there were concerns regarding the continued availability of the loading berth at Tauranga. However, the vessel was still servicing Pitcairn from the Port of Tauranga as of 2016

The ship is the subject of a 2011 $1.80 Pitcairn Islands stamp.

== Medical Aid Ship ==
In July 2019 the ship was renamed the YWAM Koha in a ceremony in Tauranga and after dry-dock maintenance she will be relaunched as a volunteer-based medical aid ship providing Primary Health Care, Dentistry, Ophthalmic Surgery and Optometry services operated by YWAM Ships Aotearoa.

She will then be taken on a multi-port promotional tour around New Zealand to raise awareness, supplies and funds for her future deployments to the Pacific.
