= Liberté-class battleship =

Four pre-dreadnought battleships built for the French Navy in the early 1900s

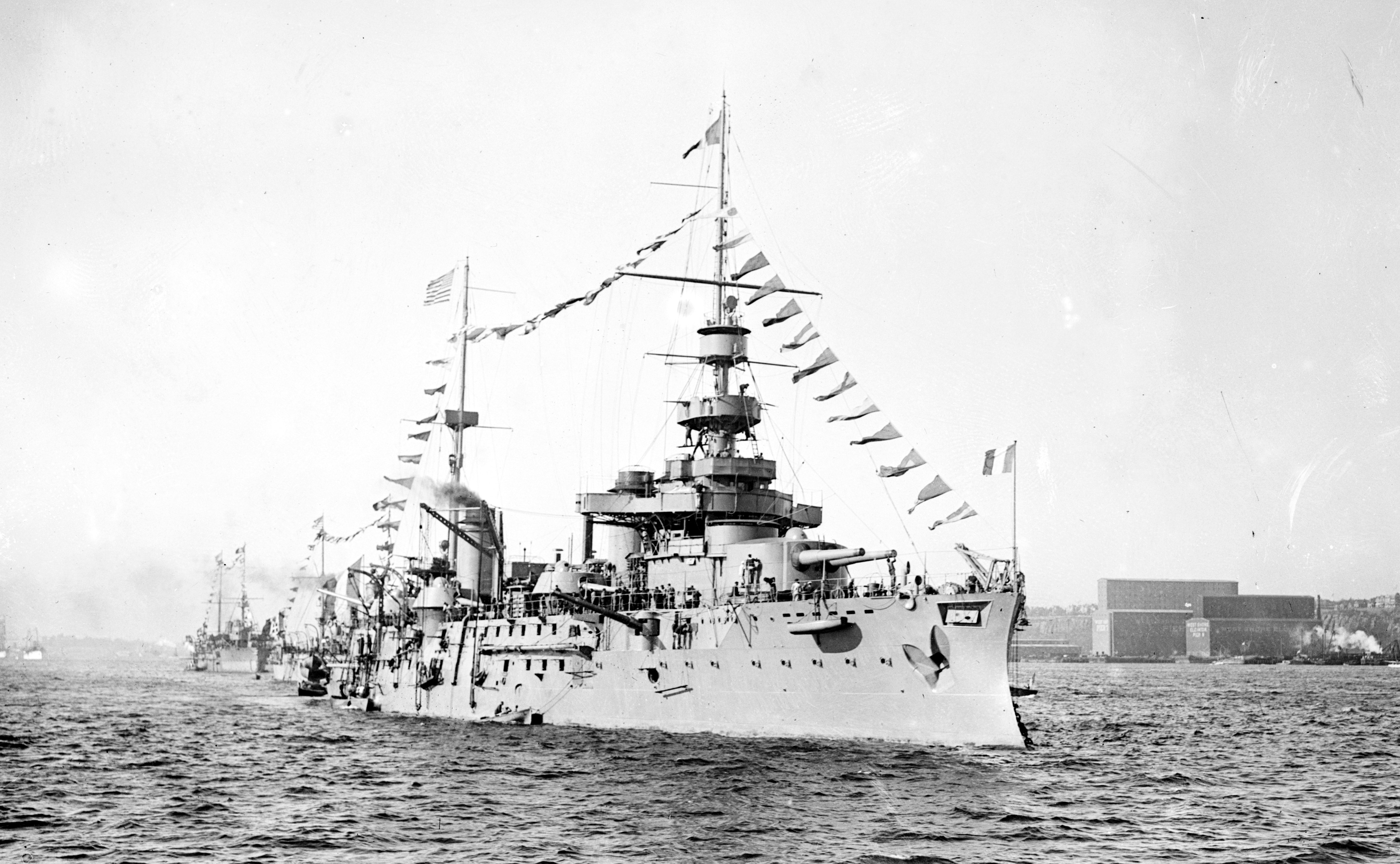
- Liberté in New York City, September 1909

Class overview
- Name: Liberté-class battleship
- Operators: French Navy
- Preceded by: République class
- Succeeded by: Danton class
- Built: 1902–1908
- In service: 1908–1922
- Completed: 4
- Lost: 1

General characteristics
- Type: Pre-dreadnought battleship
- Displacement: Full load: 14,900 t (14,700 long tons)
- Length: 135.25 m (443 ft 9 in) loa
- Beam: 24.25 m (79 ft 7 in)
- Draft: 8.2 m (26 ft 11 in)
- Installed power: 22 × Belleville boilers (Note: Except for Justice, which received twenty-four Niclausse boilers.); 17,500 CV (17,300 ihp)
- Propulsion: 3 × screw propellers; 3 × triple-expansion steam engines
- Speed: 18 knots (33 km/h; 21 mph)
- Range: 8,400 nautical miles (15,600 km; 9,700 mi) at 10 kn (19 km/h; 12 mph)
- Complement: 32 officers; 710 enlisted men
- Armament: 4 × 305 mm (12 in) guns; 10 × 194 mm (7.6 in) guns; 13 × 65 mm (2.6 in) guns; 10 × 47 mm (1.9 in) guns; 2 × 450 mm (17.7 in) torpedo tubes
- Armor: Belt: 180 to 280 mm (7.1 to 11.0 in); Turrets: 360 mm (14 in); Conning tower: 266 mm (10.5 in); Upper deck: 54 mm (2.1 in); Lower deck: 51 mm (2 in)

The Liberté class consisted of four pre-dreadnought battleships built for the French Navy in the early 1900s. The class comprised Liberté, Justice, Vérité, and Démocratie. They were ordered as part of a naval expansion program directed at countering German warship construction authorized by the German Naval Law of 1898; the French program called for six new battleships, which began with the two République-class battleships. During construction of the first two vessels, foreign adoption of heavier secondary batteries prompted the French to re-design the last four members to carry a secondary battery of 194 mm (7.6 in) guns, producing the Liberté class. Like the Républiques, their main armament consisted of four 305 mm (12 in) guns in two twin-gun turrets, and they had the same top speed of 18 knots (33 km/h; 21 mph).

Their peacetime careers were largely uneventful, consisting of a normal routine of training exercises, visits to various French and foreign ports, and naval reviews for French politicians and foreign dignitaries. In 1909, Liberté, Justice, and Vérité visited the United States during the Hudson–Fulton Celebration. Liberté was destroyed by an accidental explosion of unstable propellant charges in Toulon in 1911, prompting the fleet to enact strict handling controls to prevent further accidents. The three surviving ships were deployed to guard troop convoys from North Africa to France in the early days of World War I, thereafter deploying to the Adriatic Sea in an attempt to bring the Austro-Hungarian Navy to battle. The fleet sank an Austro-Hungarian cruiser in the Battle of Antivari but was otherwise unsuccessful in its attempt to engage the Austro-Hungarians. Vérité was briefly deployed to the Dardanelles in September 1914, where she bombarded Ottoman coastal defenses.

In 1916, the ships were sent to Greece to put pressure on the still-neutral government to join the war on the side of the Allies. The French ultimately intervened in a coup that overthrew the Greek king and brought the country into the war. The ships thereafter spent much of the rest of the war at Corfu, where they saw little activity owing to coal shortages. Following the Allied victory, Justice and Démocratie were sent to the Black Sea to oversee the demilitarization of Russian warships German forces had seized during the war, and Vérité went to Constantinople to oversee the Ottoman surrender. All three ships were recalled in mid-1919, and Vérité was decommissioned immediately thereafter. The other two ships were deactivated in 1920. All three were sold for scrap in 1921 and broken up in Italy or Germany. Liberté, still on the bottom of Toulon's harbor, was raised in 1925 and scrapped there.

== Design ==
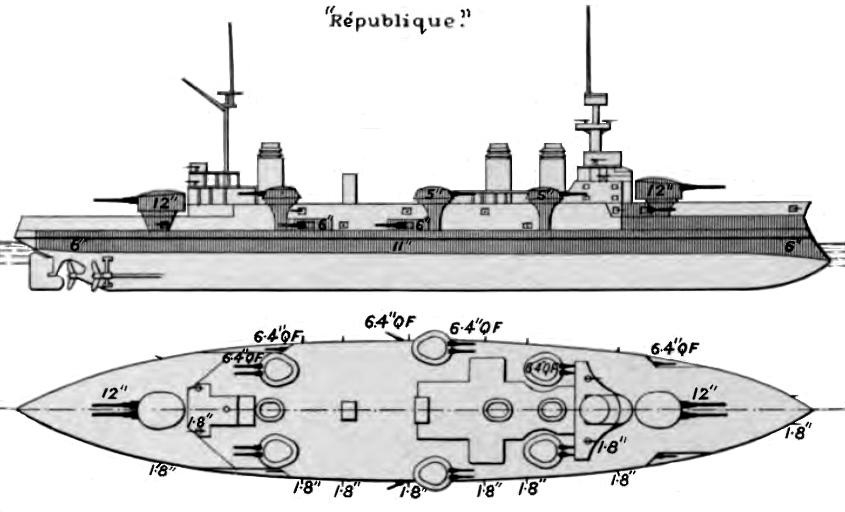
Line-drawing of the République class, the direct progenitors of the Liberté design

The Liberté class, sometimes considered part of the preceding République class, was authorized in the Fleet Law of 1900, which called for a total of six battleships, the first two of which were the République class. The law was a reaction to the German 1898 Naval Law, which marked a significant expansion of the fleet under Admiral Alfred von Tirpitz. Since Germany was France's primary potential opponent, a considerable strengthening of its fleet pressured the French parliament to authorize a similar program. Louis-Émile Bertin, who had become the Directeur central des constructions navales (DCCN—Central Director of Naval Construction) in 1896, was responsible for preparing the new design. Bertin had campaigned through the early 1890s for revisions to the battleships then being built, as he correctly determined that their shallow belt armor would render them vulnerable to hits above the belt that could cause flooding that would dangerously destabilize the vessels. (Note: The problems Bertin identified were made evident as far back as the completion of the first French pre-dreadnought, Brennus, in 1893. The ship was overloaded as completed, and her narrow belt was submerged almost completely, leaving little more than her unprotected sides exposed. The stability problems of the first generation of French battleships became readily apparent during World War I with the loss of the battleship Bouvet, which capsized rapidly after striking a mine in 1915. Another French battleship, Gaulois, was badly damaged by shellfire during the same operation and nearly sank; she and her sister ship Saint Louis were reconstructed in 1915–1916 to improve their stability, though nothing could be done about the height of the belt armor.)

Upon becoming the DCCN, Bertin was now in a position to advance his ideas on battleship construction. In November 1897, he called for a battleship displacing 13,600 metric tons (13,400 long tons), a significant increase in size over earlier battleships, which would allow him to incorporate the more comprehensive armor layout he deemed necessary to defeat the latest generation of armor-piercing shells. The new ship would be protected by a tall belt that covered much of the length of the hull, topped with a flat armored deck that created a large armored box, which was highly subdivided with watertight compartments to reduce the risk of uncontrollable flooding.

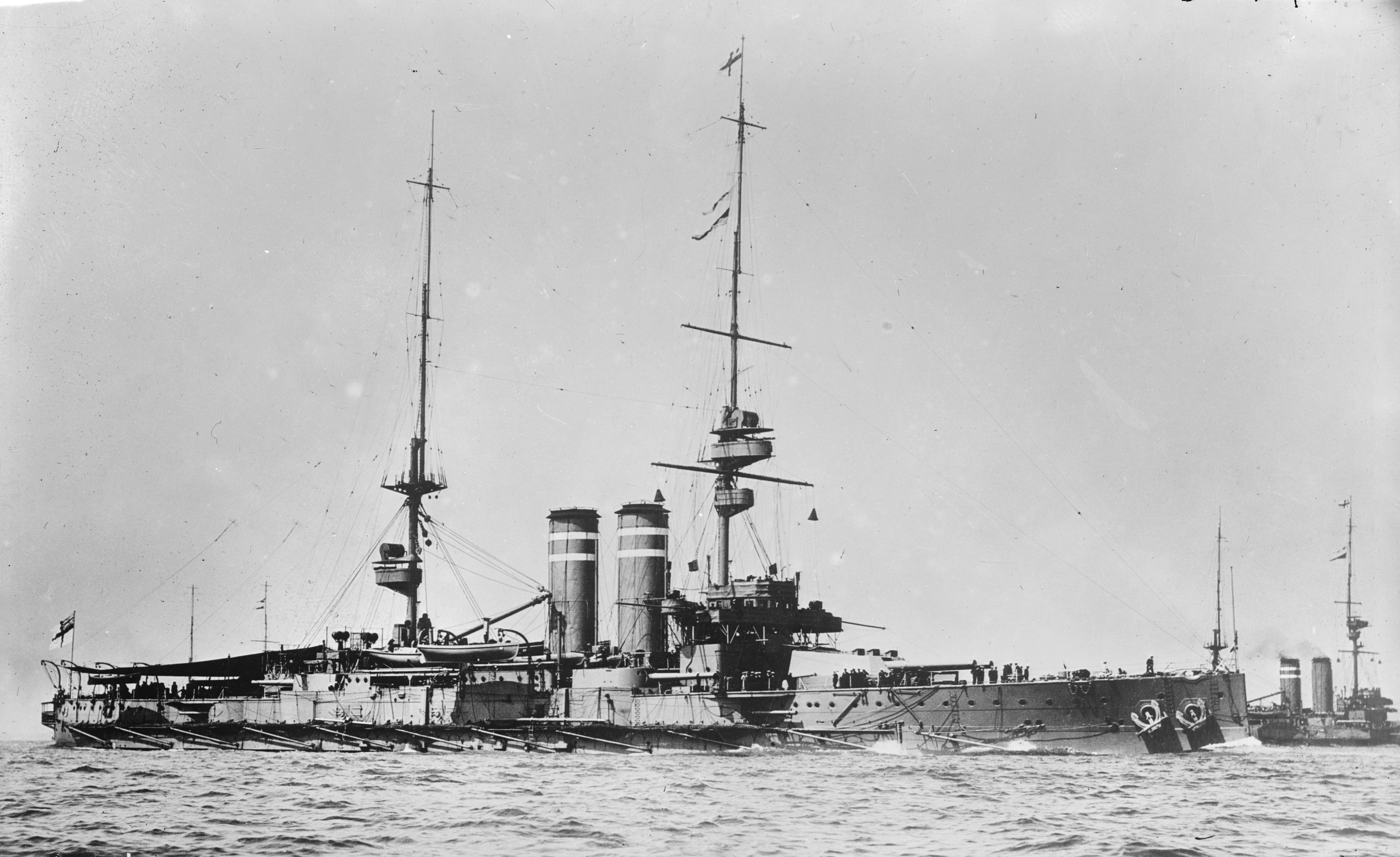
HMS King Edward VII, one of the foreign battleships that prompted the redesign of the latter four Républiques

Detailed design work on the new ship continued for the next two years, as the design staff worked out the particulars of the ship. The staff submitted a revised proposal on 20 April 1898, with displacement now increased to 15,000 t (15,000 long tons), which was on par with contemporary British designs. To ensure passage through the Suez Canal, draft was limited to 8.4 m (28 ft) and the standard main armament of four 305 mm (12 in) guns in two twin-gun turrets was specified. The naval command approved the submission, but requested alterations to the design, particularly to the arrangement of the secondary battery layout. These proved difficult to incorporate, as the requested changes increased topweight, which necessitated reductions in armor thicknesses to keep the ship from becoming too top-heavy. The navy refused to allow the reductions, however, and so further rearrangements were considered.

On 23 December, the designers evaluated a pair of proposals for the secondary gun turrets from Schneider-Creusot and the government-run Direction de l'artillerie (Artillery Directorate); the proposal from the latter was adopted for the new ship. Another meeting on 28 April 1899 settled on the final characteristics of the design, and on 29 May, Bertin was directed to alter the design to conform to the adopted specifications. Final design work took another two months, and Bertin submitted the finalized version on 8 August. After nearly a year of inaction, Jean Marie Antoine de Lanessan, the Minister of the Navy, approved the design on 10 July 1900, and on 9 December the parliament approved the 1900 Fleet Law that authorized a total of six ships.

During the lengthy design process, new battleships being built abroad, particularly the British King Edward VII-class battleships, led to a re-design of the last four members of the class, resulting in the Libertés. Foreign battleships began to carry a heavy secondary battery, such as the 9.2 in (230 mm) guns of the King Edward VIIs, which prompted an increase in French secondary batteries from 164.7 to 194 mm (6.48 to 7.64 in) for the last four ships. Unfortunately for the French ships, they entered service shortly after the revolutionary all-big-gun battleship HMS Dreadnought was completed for the Royal Navy, rendering pre-dreadnoughts like them obsolescent. The Libertés nevertheless provided the basis for the subsequent French battleships of the Danton class.

=== General characteristics ===
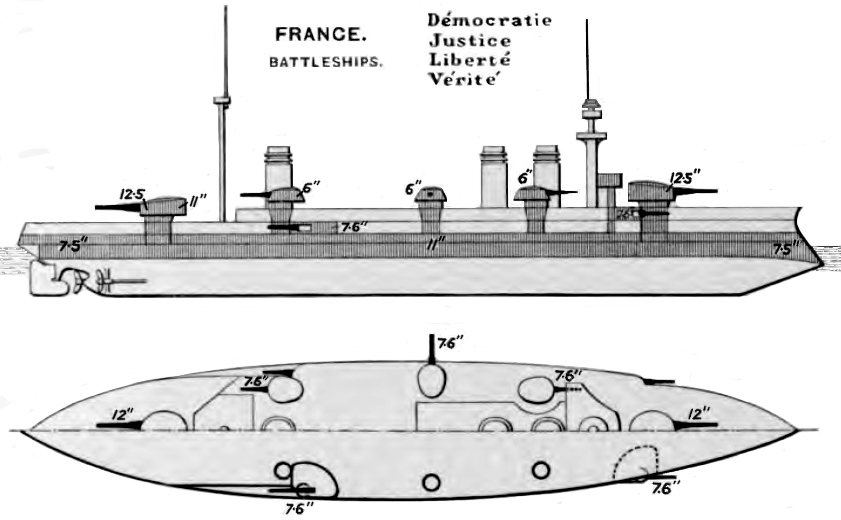
Right elevation and deck plan as depicted in Brassey's Naval Annual

The ships were 131 m (429 ft 9 in) long at the waterline, 133.8 m (439 ft) long between perpendiculars, and 135.25 m (443 ft 9 in) long overall. They had a beam of 24.25 m (79 ft 7 in) at the waterline and an average draft of 8.2 m (26 ft 11 in). They displaced up to 14,900 t (14,700 long tons) at full load. The ships' hulls were modeled on the Gloire-class cruisers, which Bertin had also designed. The hulls were divided into 15 watertight compartments below the lower armor deck. Bilge keels were fitted to improve their stability.

The Liberté-class ships were built with a tall forecastle deck that extended all the way to the mainmast. They retained a small fighting mast for the foremast, but had a lighter pole mast for the mainmast. The forward superstructure consisted of a four-deck structure erected around the foremast and the conning tower. The charthouse, commander's quarters, and bridge were located here. In service, the arrangement proved to have several problems; the conning tower was too small to accommodate the crew, the bridge wings obstructed views aft, which forced the commander to leave the safety of the armored conning tower to see all around the ship. In 1912–1913, the wings were removed to reduce the problem. Similar problems caused difficulties in the aft superstructure as well, particularly with the rear fire control system.

They had a crew of 32 officers and 710 enlisted men, though while serving as a flagship, their crews were increased to 44 officers and 765 enlisted men to include an admiral's staff. Each battleship carried eighteen smaller boats, including pinnaces, cutters, dinghies, whalers, and punts. As a flagship, these boats were augmented with an admiral's gig, another cutter, and three more whalers. As completed, the ships wore the standard paint scheme of the French fleet: green for the hull below the waterline and black above, and buff for the superstructure. This scheme was replaced in 1908 with a medium blue-gray that replaced the black and buff, while the green hull paint was eventually replaced with dark red.

=== Machinery ===
The ships were powered by three 4-cylinder vertical triple expansion engines with twenty-two Belleville boilers, with the exception of Justice, which received twenty-four Niclausse boilers. The boilers were divided into four boiler rooms, with the forward three trunked into two funnels and the aft room ducted into the rear funnel. The engines were located amidships in separate watertight compartments, between the forward group of three boiler rooms and the aft one. Each engine drove a bronze, three-bladed screw; the centerline propeller was 4.85 m (15 ft 11 in) in diameter and the outboard screws were 5 m (16 ft 5 in) in diameter. The ships were equipped with six electric generators; two 500-ampere generators were used to power the main battery turrets and ammunition hoists and four 800-amp generators provided power for the rest of the ships' systems.

The propulsion system was rated at 17,500 metric horsepower (17,260 ihp) and provided a top speed of 18 knots (33 km/h; 21 mph) as designed. Coal storage amounted to 900 t (890 long tons) normally and up to 1,800 t (1,800 long tons) at full load. At an economical cruising speed of 10 kn (19 km/h; 12 mph), the ships could steam for 8,400 nautical miles (15,600 km; 9,700 mi).

=== Armament ===
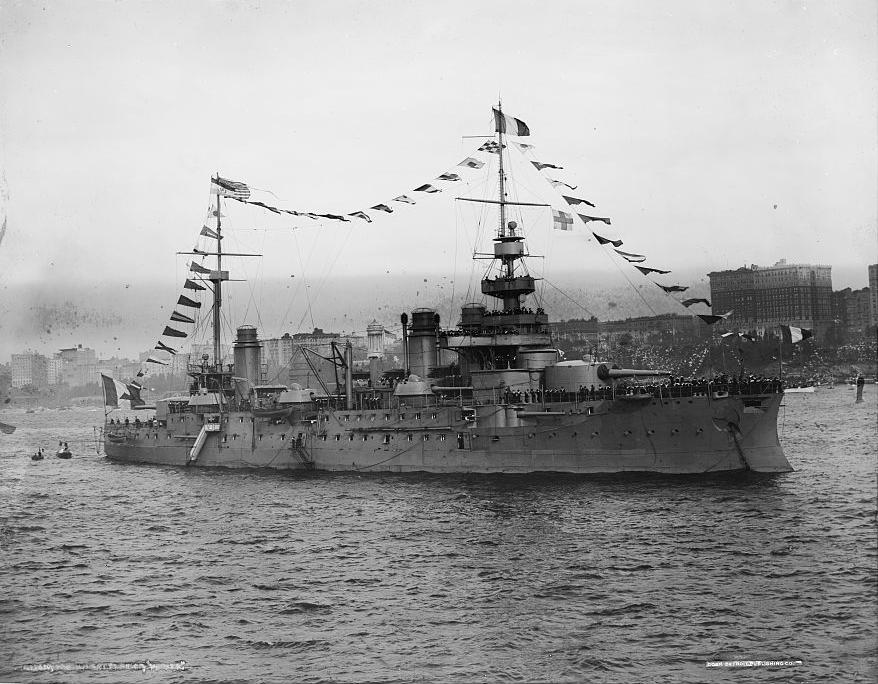
Vérité in the United States in 1909, showing the arrangement of the forward main battery turret and the secondary turret and casemate guns

The main battery for the Liberté-class ships consisted of four Canon de 305 mm Modèle 1893/96 guns mounted in two twin-gun turrets, one forward and one aft. These guns fired a 350-kilogram (770 lb) shell at a muzzle velocity of 865 meters per second (2,840 ft/s). At their maximum elevation of 12 degrees, the guns had a range of 12,500 m (41,000 ft). Their rate of fire was one round per minute. Both the turrets and the guns were electrically operated; both guns were typically elevated together, but they could be decoupled and operated independently if the need arose. The guns had to be depressed to a fixed loading position, −5 degrees, between shots. Ready ammunition storage amounted to eight rounds per turret. Though earlier French battleships had carried several types of shells, including armor-piercing (APC), semi-armor-piercing (SAPC), cast iron, high-explosive, and shrapnel shells, the Libertés standardized on a load-out of just APC and SAPC shells. In peacetime, each gun was supplied with 65 shells, for a total of 260 per ship, of which 104 were APC and the remaining 156 were SAPC. The wartime supply was three times that, at 780 shells in total.

The secondary battery consisted of ten 194 mm (7.6 in) Modèle 1902 guns; six were mounted in single turrets and the remaining four were in casemates in the hull. The six turrets were distributed along the central portion of the ship, two abreast the forward pair of funnels, two amidships, and the last pair abreast the rear funnel. The casemate guns were arranged in pairs, one on either side of the forward main battery turret, and the other was slightly forward of the rear pair of secondary turrets. The guns had a firing rate of two shots per minute. With a maximum elevation of 15 degrees, the guns had a range of 12,000 m (39,000 ft). Muzzle velocity was 865 m/s (2,840 ft/s). The turrets were electrically trained but manually elevated, while the casemate guns were entirely manually operated. Both had a storage capacity of twelve rounds and their propellant charges, before ammunition had to be retrieved from the magazines. Each gun was supplied with 200 shells, of which 150 were SAPC and the remainder were APC. The ships also carried a total of 78 cast iron shells and 20 training rounds.

For close-range defense against torpedo boats, they carried a tertiary battery of thirteen 65 mm (2.6 in) Modèle 1902 guns and ten 47 mm (1.9 in) Modèle 1902 guns. The 65 mm guns had a rate of fire of 15 shots per minute and a maximum range of 8,000 m (26,000 ft), and they were placed in individual mounts in the hull with firing ports. The 47 mm guns were placed in the fighting tops on the masts and the forward and aft superstructures. The 47 mm guns had the same rate of fire as the 65 mm guns, but their range was less, at 6,000 m (20,000 ft). They also fired a significantly lighter shell, 2 kg (4.4 lb), compared to the 4.17 kg (9.2 lb) shell of the larger gun. Ammunition stowage amounted to 450 rounds per gun for the 65 mm weapons and 550 shells per gun for the 47 mm guns.

The ships were also armed with two 450 mm (18 in) torpedo tubes, which were submerged in the hull on the broadside. They were arranged at a fixed angle, 19 degrees forward of the beam. Each tube was supplied with three Modèle 1904 torpedoes, which had a range of 1,000 m (3,300 ft) at a speed of 32.5 kn (60.2 km/h; 37.4 mph), carrying a 100 kg (220 lb) warhead. Each ship carried twenty naval mines that could be laid by the vessels' pinnaces.

=== Armor ===
The ship's main belt armor consisted of two strakes of cemented steel that was 280 mm (11 in) amidships, which was reduced to 180 mm (7.1 in) at the bow and stern. The belt terminated close to the stern and was capped with a transverse bulkhead that was 200 mm (7.9 in) thick backed with 80 mm (3.1 in) of teak planking, which was in turn supported by two layers of 10 mm (0.39 in) plating. Forward, it extended all the way to the stem. It extended from 0.5 m (1 ft 8 in) below the waterline to 2.3 m (7 ft 7 in) above the line, and along the upper edge of the belt, it tapered slightly to 240 mm (9.4 in). A third, thinner strake of armor covered the upper hull at the main deck and 1st deck levels; it consisted of 64 mm (2.5 in) of steel plating on 80 mm of teak. It was connected to the forward main battery barbette by a 154 mm (6.1 in) bulkhead.

Horizontal protection consisted of two armored decks. The upper deck, at main deck level, covered almost the entire ship, from the bow to the aft transverse bulkhead. It consisted of three layers of 18 mm (0.71 in) steel for a total thickness of 54 mm (2.1 in). Below that, the lower deck was flat over the engine and boiler rooms, consisting of three layers of 17 mm (0.67 in) steel, the total thickness being 51 mm (2 in). On the sides of the deck, it angled down to connect to the lower edge of the main belt. The sloped sides were two layers of 36 mm (1.4 in) steel. Sandwiched between the two decks and directly behind the belt was an extensively subdivided cofferdam, which Bertin intended to limit flooding in the event of battle damage. Coal storage bunkers were placed behind the cofferdam to absorb shell splinters or armor fragments.

The main battery turrets received the heaviest armor; the faces of the gunhouses were 360 mm (14 in) thick and the sides and rears were 280 mm thick, all cemented steel. Behind each plate were two layers of 20 mm (0.79 in) thick steel. The roof consisted of three layers of 24 mm (0.94 in) of steel. Their barbettes were 246 mm (9.7 in) thick above the main deck and reduced to 66 mm (2.6 in) below the deck; for the forward barbette, a transitional thickness of 166 mm (6.5 in) was used where the barbette was covered by the thin upper belt. The ships' secondary turrets received plates that were 156 mm (6.1 in) thick on the face and sides, backed by two layers of steel that were both 13 mm (0.51 in) thick. The rear of the turret, designed to counter-balance the weight of the gun, was 282 mm (11.1 in) of mild steel. Below the turrets, the ammunition handling rooms were protected by 143 mm (5.6 in) of steel on double layers of 12 mm (0.47 in) plating (with Justice instead receiving 130 mm (5.1 in) of cemented armor on double layers of 18.5 mm (0.73 in) plating). The trunks down to the magazines were covered by 84 mm (3.3 in) of cemented armor above the main deck and 14 mm (0.55 in) below, where it was behind the belt. The casemate guns received 174 mm (6.9 in) of cemented armor fixed to two layers of 13 mm steel on the outer walls, and 102 mm (4 in) on the interior walls.

The forward conning tower had 266 mm (10.5 in) of steel on the front and side, with a 216 mm (8.5 in) thick rear wall. All four sides were backed by two layers of 17 mm plating. Access to the rear entrance to the tower was shielded by a curved bulkhead that was 174 mm thick. A heavily armored tube that was 200 mm thick protected the communication system that connected the conning tower with the transmitting station lower in the ship. Below the upper deck, it was reduced to 20 mm on two layers of 10 mm steel.

== Ships ==
Construction data
Name	Builder	Laid down	Launched	Commissioned
Liberté	Ateliers et Chantiers de la Loire	November 1902	19 April 1905	13 April 1908
Justice	Société Nouvelle des Forges et Chantiers de la Méditerranée	1 April 1903	27 October 1904	15 April 1908
Vérité	Société Nouvelle des Forges et Chantiers de la Méditerranée	April 1903	28 May 1907	11 September 1908
Démocratie	Arsenal de Brest	1 May 1903	30 April 1904	9 January 1908

== Service history ==
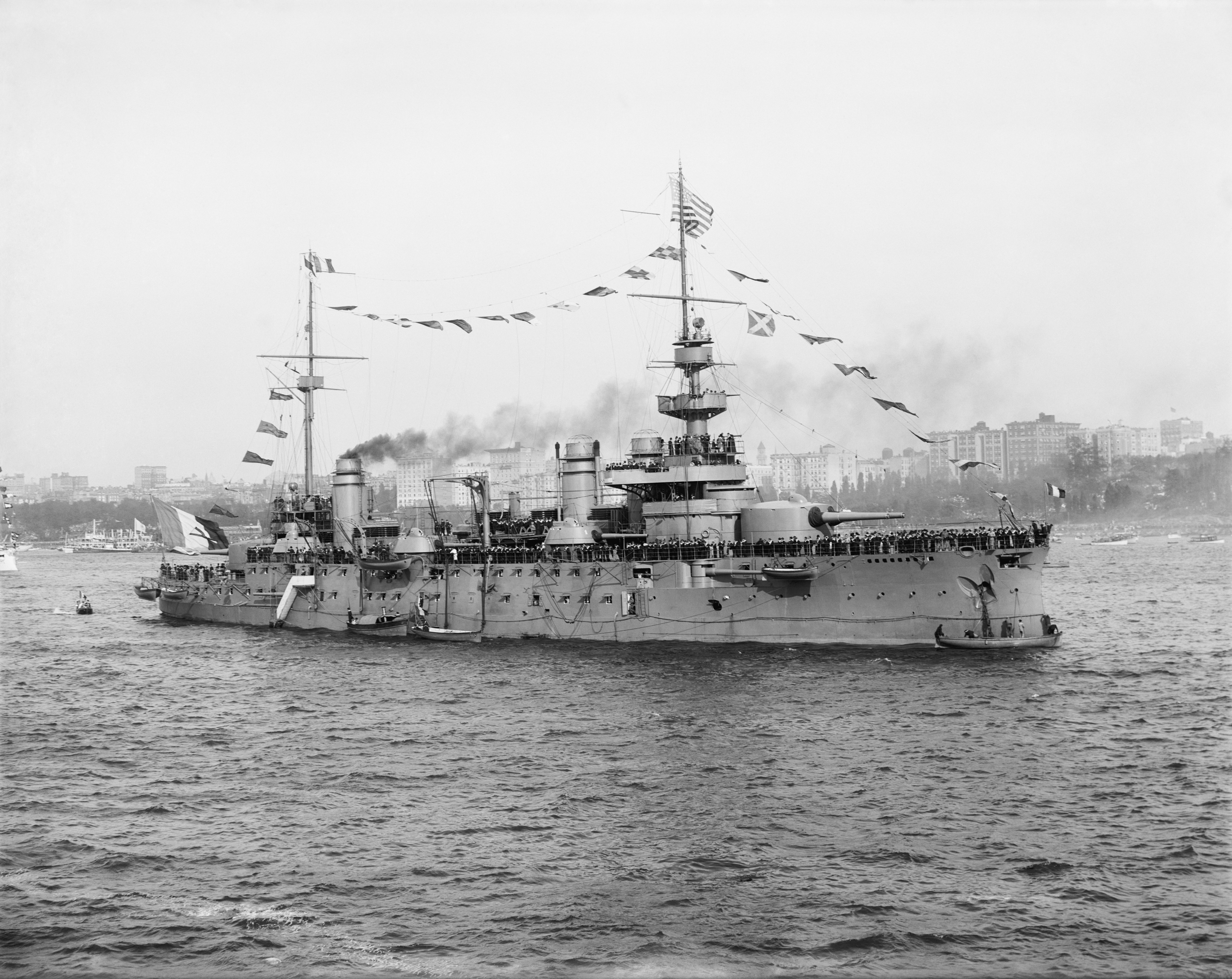
Justice at the Hudson–Fulton Celebration in September 1909

=== Pre-war ===
The members of the class were assigned to the 2nd Division of the Mediterranean Squadron after entering service, with the exception of Démocratie, which served in the 1st Division along with the battleships République and Patrie. Justice served as the flagship of the 2nd Division. Toulon was the squadron's home port, though they frequently also lay in Golfe-Juan and Villefranche-sur-Mer. Throughout the 1900s and early 1910s, the ships were occupied with routine peacetime training exercises in the western Mediterranean Sea and Atlantic. They also held numerous naval reviews for the President of France, other government officials, and various foreign dignitaries during this period. The ships also made frequent visits to foreign ports in the Mediterranean, including visits to Spain, Monaco, and Italy, among others. Most notable among these visits was a voyage by the 2nd Division ships across the Atlantic to represent France at the Hudson–Fulton Celebration in the United States in 1909.

By early 1911, the Danton-class battleships had begun to enter service, displacing the Liberté and République class battleships to what was now the 2nd Squadron of the Mediterranean Fleet. Early on 25 September, while at Toulon, Liberté was destroyed by an accidental magazine explosion that killed nearly three hundred of her crew. A subsequent investigation revealed the cause to be unstable Poudre B propellant used by the French Navy at the time; stricter controls were put in place to reduce the likelihood of another accident. The three surviving members of the class spent the following three years in a similar pattern of training exercises and cruises around the Mediterranean. Following the assassination of Archduke Franz Ferdinand in June 1914 and during the ensuing July Crisis, the ships remained close to Toulon to be prepared for the possibility of war.

=== World War I ===
Vérité at anchor

At the outbreak of World War I in August 1914, the French fleet was mobilized to defend the troop convoys carrying elements of the army from French North Africa to Metropolitan France. The German battlecruiser SMS Goeben was in the Mediterranean at the time, and the French high command feared it would try to interdict the convoys. The ships of the 2nd Squadron steamed to Algiers, and then escorted a convoy of troop ships carrying some 7,000 men until they were relieved midway to France by the dreadnoughts Jean Bart and Courbet. They thereafter joined the rest of the main French fleet and made a sweep into the Adriatic Sea to attempt to bring the Austro-Hungarian Navy to battle. The French encountered just the protected cruiser SMS Zenta and a torpedo boat, sinking the former in the Battle of Antivari on 16 August. Patrols in the southern Adriatic followed, and later that month, Justice and Démocratie accidentally collided in heavy fog while on patrol, necessitating withdrawal for repairs. After repeated attacks by Austro-Hungarian U-boats, the battleships of the fleet withdrew to Corfu and Malta, while lighter units continued the sweeps.

While the bulk of the fleet remained at Corfu, Vérité was sent to strengthen the Anglo-French naval force that had gathered at the Dardanelles in September to trap Goeben, which had been sold to the Ottoman Empire. She participated in the bombardment of Ottoman coastal fortifications there in November. After Italy entered the war in May 1915, the Italian fleet took over patrol duties in the southern Adriatic, allowing the French fleet to withdraw. Démocratie and Justice were detached to reinforce the Dardanelles Division fighting in the last stages of the Gallipoli campaign. The 2nd Squadron ships were then sent to Greece to put pressure on the neutral but pro-German government; they sent men ashore in December 1916 to support a coup launched by pro-Allied elements in the government, but were compelled to retreat by the Greek Army. The French and British fleets then blockaded the country, eventually forcing the Greek monarch, Constantine I, to abdicate in June 1917. His replacement led the country into the war on the side of the Allies. The French fleet then returned to Corfu, where they spent the rest of the war; coal shortages prevented the fleet from taking any significant action during this period.

=== Postwar fates ===
Immediately after the war ended with the signing of the armistice with Germany in November 1918, Justice and Démocratie were sent into the Black Sea to oversee the demilitarization of Russian warships that had been seized by German forces during the war. There, during the Allied intervention in the Russian Civil War, Justice's war-weary crew was involved in a mutiny in April 1919. Both ships left the area in May, with Démocratie carrying Grand Vizier Damat Ferid Pasha to France so he could sign the Treaty of Sèvres that officially ended World War I for the Ottoman Empire. Vérité initially went to Constantinople to supervise the surrender of Ottoman forces, but quickly returned to France where she was decommissioned on 1 August 1919. Justice was briefly retained as a training ship but Démocratie saw no further service after being placed in reserve in April 1920. Vérité and Démocratie were stricken from the naval register in May 1921 and broken up in Italy later that year, while Justice was reduced to reserve in April 1920, decommissioned in March 1921, and sold for scrap in Germany in December that year. Liberté, which had remained sunken at her berth in Toulon, was finally re-floated in 1925 and towed into a dry dock there, where she was broken up.
