= French battleship Liberté =

French lead ship of Liberté-class

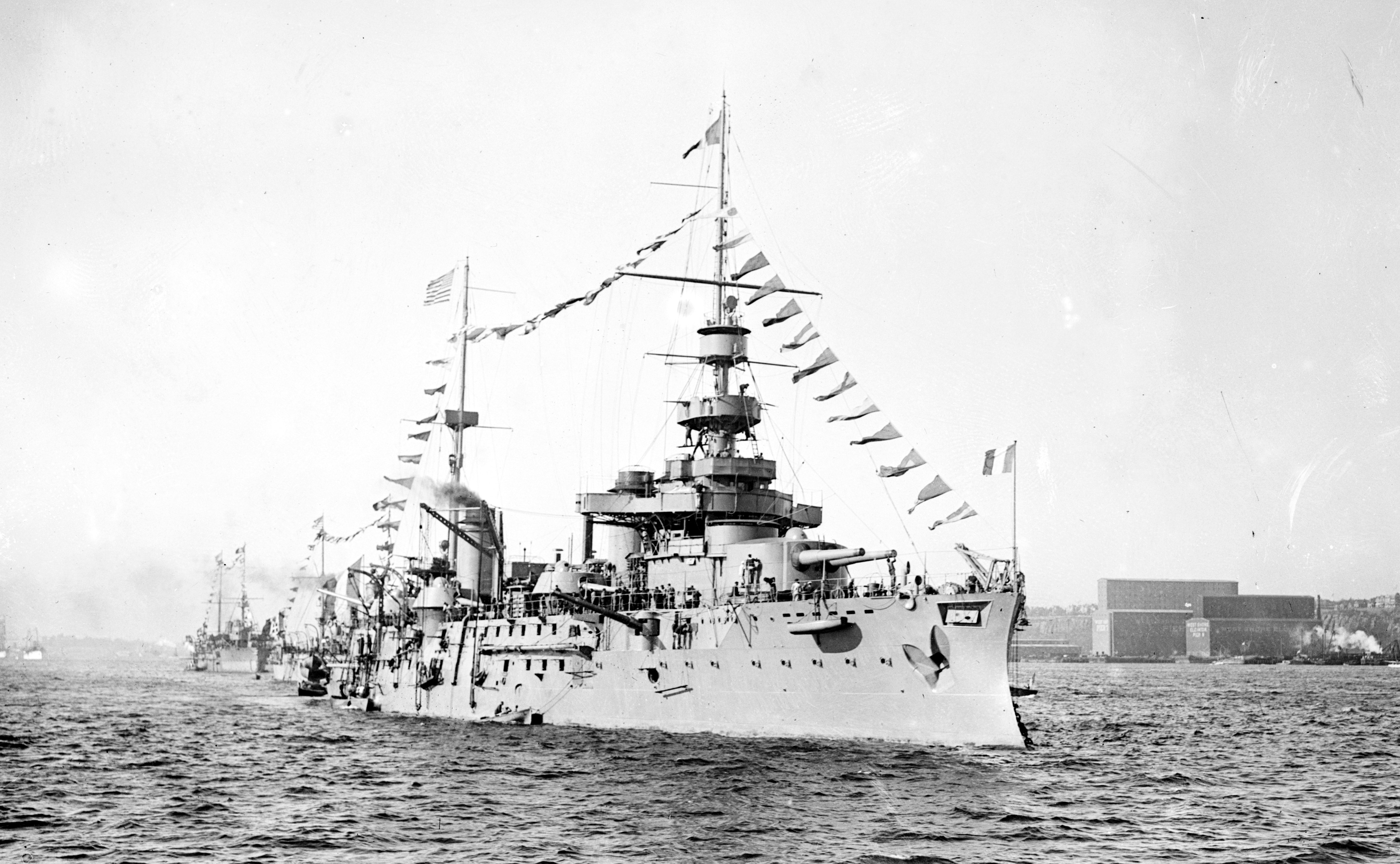
- Liberté in New York Harbor during the visit to the United States

History

France
- Name: Liberté
- Namesake: Liberty
- Builder: Ateliers et Chantiers de la Loire, Saint-Nazaire
- Laid down: November 1902
- Launched: 19 April 1905
- Completed: 13 April 1908
- Fate: Destroyed by accidental explosion, 25 September 1911

General characteristics
- Class & type: Liberté-class battleship
- Displacement: Full load: 14,900 t (14,700 long tons)
- Length: 135.25 m (443 ft 9 in) loa
- Beam: 24.25 m (79 ft 7 in)
- Draft: 8.2 m (26 ft 11 in)
- Installed power: 22 × Belleville boilers; 17,500 CV (17,300 ihp; 12,900 kW)
- Propulsion: 3 × screw propellers; 3 × triple-expansion steam engines
- Speed: 18 knots (33 km/h; 21 mph)
- Range: 8,400 nautical miles (15,600 km; 9,700 mi) at 10 kn (19 km/h; 12 mph)
- Complement: 32 officers; 710 enlisted men
- Armament: 4 × 305 mm (12 in) guns; 10 × 194 mm (7.6 in) guns; 13 × 65 mm (2.6 in) guns; 10 × 47 mm (1.9 in) guns; 2 × 450 mm (17.7 in) torpedo tubes
- Armor: Belt: 180 to 280 mm (7.1 to 11.0 in); Turrets: 360 mm (14 in); Conning tower: 266 mm (10.5 in); Upper deck: 54 mm (2.1 in); Lower deck: 51 mm (2 in)

Liberté was a pre-dreadnought battleship built for the French Navy in the mid-1900s. She was the lead ship of the Liberté class, which included three other vessels and was a derivative of the preceding République class, with the primary difference being the inclusion of a heavier secondary battery. Liberté carried a main battery of four 305-millimeter (12 in) guns, like the République, but mounted ten 194 mm (7.6 in) guns for her secondary armament in place of the 164 mm (6.5 in) guns of the earlier vessels. Like many late pre-dreadnought designs, Liberté was completed after the revolutionary British battleship HMS Dreadnought had entered service, rendering her obsolescent.

On entering service, Liberté was assigned to the 2nd Division of the Mediterranean Squadron, based in Toulon. She immediately began the normal peacetime training routine of squadron and fleet maneuvers and cruises to various ports in the Mediterranean. She also participated in several naval reviews for a number of French and foreign dignitaries. In September 1909, the ships of the 2nd Division crossed the Atlantic to the United States to represent France at the Hudson–Fulton Celebration.

Liberté's active career was cut short on 25 September 1911 when a fire broke out in one of the ship's propellant magazines and led to a detonation of the charges stored there, destroying the ship in a tremendous explosion that killed 286 of her crew. The blast also damaged several other vessels and killed crewmen on six neighboring ships. An investigation revealed that the standard French propellant, Poudre B, was prone to decomposition that rendered it very unstable; it had likely been the culprit in several other ammunition fires in other ships. The wreck remained in Toulon until 1925, when her destroyed hull was refloated, towed into a drydock, and broken up.

== Design ==
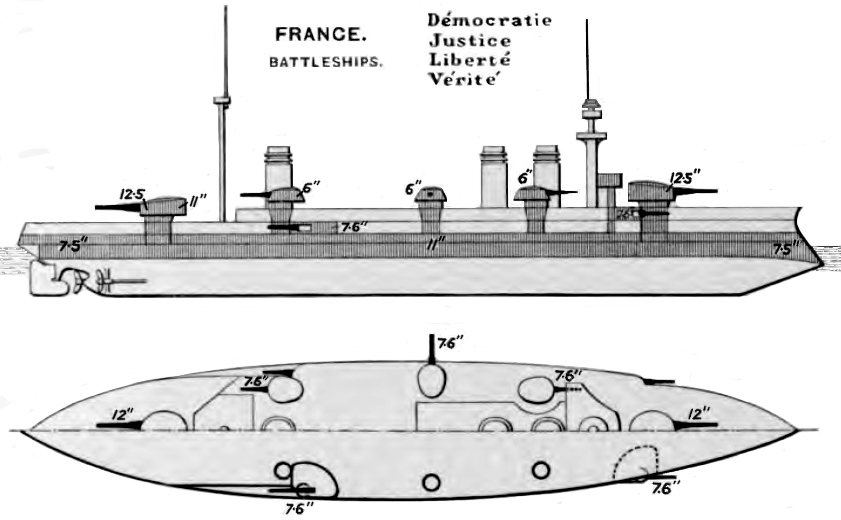
Line-drawing of the Liberté class

The Liberté-class battleships were originally intended to be part of the République-class battleship, which was to total six ships. After work on the first two ships had begun, the British began construction of the King Edward VII-class battleships. These ships carried a heavy secondary battery of 9.2-inch (230 mm) guns, which prompted the French Naval General Staff to request that the last four Républiques be redesigned to include a heavier secondary battery in response. Ironically, the designer, Louis-Émile Bertin, had proposed such an armament for the République class, but the General Staff had rejected it since the larger guns had a lower rate of fire than the smaller 164 mm (6.5 in) guns that had been selected for the République design. Because the ships were broadly similar apart from their armament, the Libertés are sometimes considered to be a sub-class of the République type.

Liberté had an overall length of 135.25 meters (443 ft 9 in), a beam of 24.25 m (79 ft 7 in) and an average draft of 8.2 m (26 ft 11 in). She displaced 14,900 metric tons (14,700 long tons) at full load and was fitted with a ram bow. The battleship was powered by three 4-cylinder vertical triple-expansion steam engines, each driving one propeller shaft using steam provided by twenty-two Belleville boilers. The engines were rated at 17,500 metric horsepower (17,300 ihp; 12,900 kW) and were intended to give the ship a speed of 18 knots (33 km/h; 21 mph). While Liberté's sea trials data has not survived, each of her sister ships exceeded a speed of 19 knots (35 km/h; 22 mph). Coal storage amounted to 1,800 t (1,772 long tons), which provided a maximum range of 8,400 nautical miles (15,600 km; 9,700 mi) at a cruising speed of 10 knots (19 km/h; 12 mph). She had a crew of 32 officers and 710 enlisted men.

Liberté's main battery consisted of four 305 mm (12 in) Modèle 1893/96 guns mounted in two twin-gun turrets, one forward and one aft of the superstructure. Her secondary armament consisted of ten 194 mm (7.6 in) Modèle 1902 guns; six were mounted in single turrets, and four in casemates in the hull. The single turrets were arranged in pairs, one set abreast the forward funnels, another two amidships, and the third pair abreast the rear funnel. She also carried thirteen 65 mm (2.6 in) Modèle 1902 guns and ten 47 mm (1.9 in) Modèle 1902 guns for defense against torpedo boats. The ship was armed with two 450 mm (17.7 in) torpedo tubes, which were submerged in the hull on the broadside.

The waterline armor belt of the Liberté class was 280 mm (11 in) thick amidships and reduced to 180 mm (7.1 in) at the ends of the ships. It was connected to the two armored decks; the upper deck was 54 mm (2.1 in) thick while the lower deck was 51 mm (2 in) thick, with 70 mm (2.8 in) sloped sides. The main battery guns were protected by up to 360 mm (14.2 in) of armor on the fronts of the turrets, while the secondary turrets had 156 mm (6.1 in) of armor on the faces. The casemates were protected with 174 mm (6.9 in) of steel plate. The conning tower had 266 mm (10.5 in) thick sides.

== Service history ==
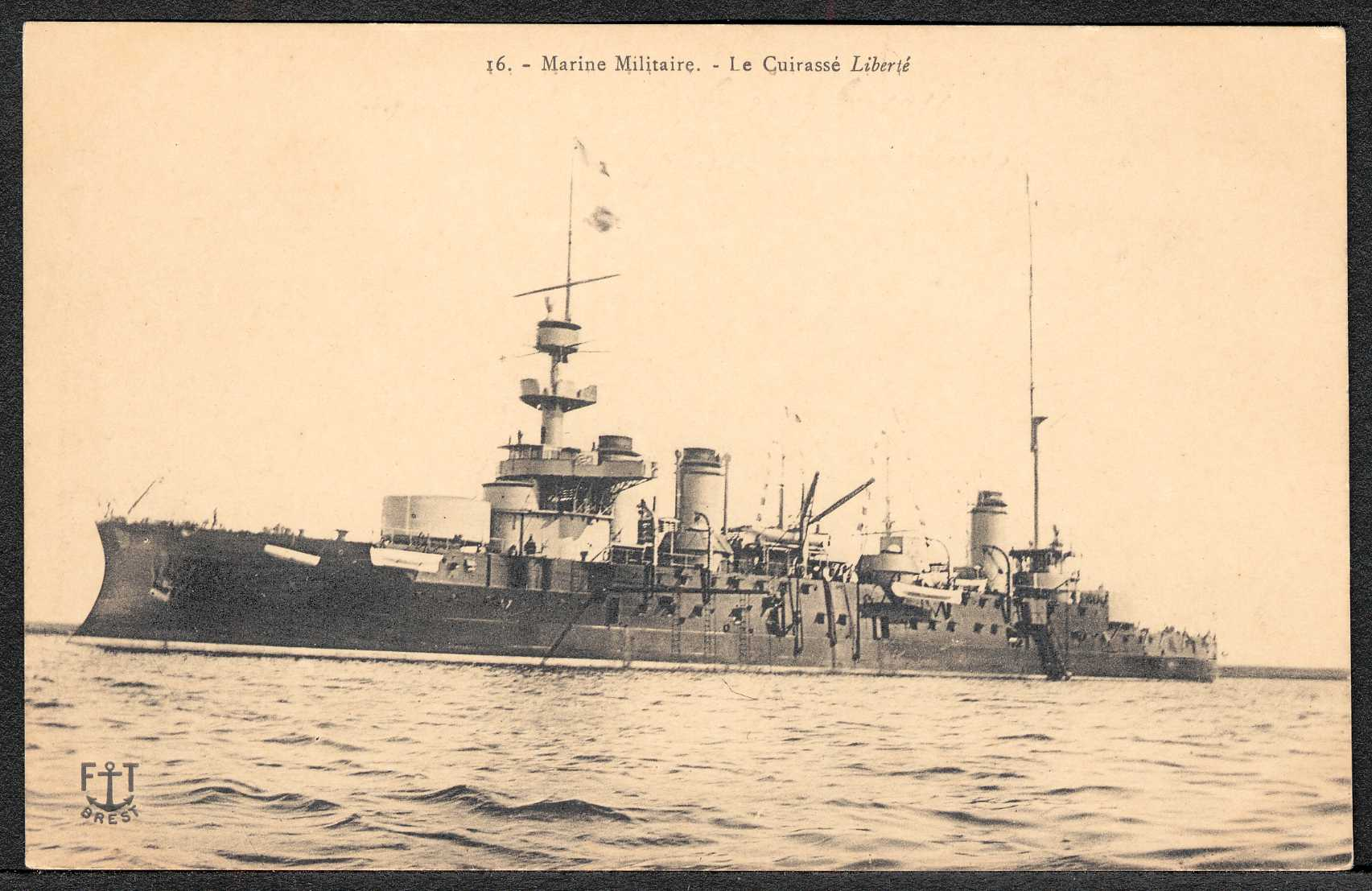
Postcard depicting Liberté

Authorized as part of the 1900 Statut Naval (Naval Law), Liberté was laid down at the Ateliers et Chantiers de la Loire shipyard in Saint-Nazaire in November 1902 and launched on 19 April 1905. On 5 September 1907, Liberté steamed to the Arsenal de Brest in Brest, France, where her armament was installed. She departed Brest on 18 March, bound for the Mediterranean Sea, and after arriving in Toulon, was pronounced complete on 13 April 1908. This was over a year after the revolutionary British battleship HMS Dreadnought, which rendered the pre-dreadnoughts like Liberté outdated before they were completed.

After commissioning, Liberté was assigned to the 2nd Division of the Mediterranean Squadron, along with her sisters Justice (the divisional flagship) and Vérité. In June and July, the Mediterranean and Northern Squadrons conducted their annual maneuvers off Bizerte. The 2nd Division ships visited Bizerte in October. The entire squadron was moored in Villefranche in February 1909 and thereafter conducted training exercises off Corsica, followed by a naval review in Villefranche for President Armand Fallières on 26 April. During this period of training, on 17 March, Liberté and the battleships Justice, Patrie, and République conducted shooting training, using the old ironclad Tempête as a target.

Liberté, Démocratie, Patrie, and the armored cruiser Ernest Renan steamed into the Atlantic for training exercises on 2 June; while at sea ten days later, they rendezvoused with République, Justice, and the protected cruiser Galilée at Cádiz, Spain. Training included serving as targets for the fleet's submarines in the Pertuis d'Antioche strait. The ships then steamed north to La Pallice, where they conducted tests with their wireless telegraphy sets and shooting training in Quiberon Bay. From 8 to 15 July, the ships lay at Brest and the next day, they steamed to Le Havre. There, they met the Northern Squadron for another fleet review for Fallières on 17 July. Ten days later, the combined fleet steamed to Cherbourg, where they held another fleet review, this time during the visit of Czar Nicholas II of Russia. On 12 September, Liberté and the other 2nd Division battleships departed Brest, bound for the United States. There they represented France during the Hudson–Fulton Celebration, which marked the 300th anniversary of the European discovery of the Hudson River. The ships arrived back in Toulon on 27 October.

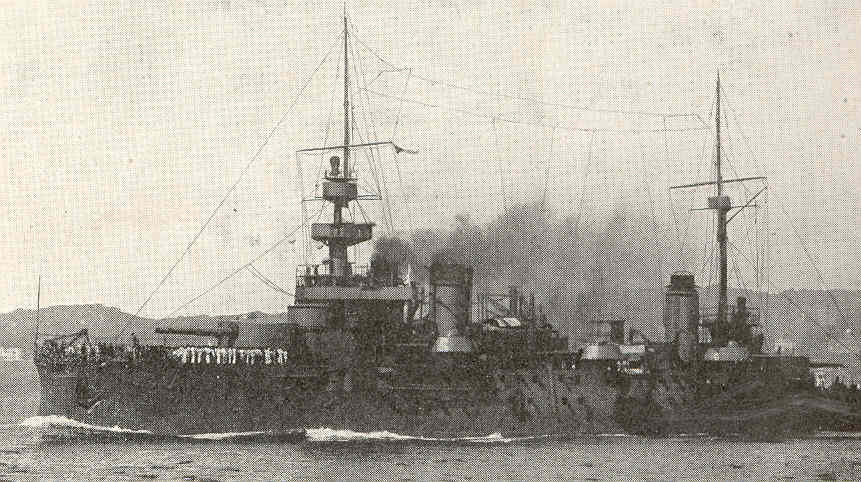
Liberté underway

The year 1910 passed uneventfully for Liberté, apart from the typical routine of training exercises. Maneuvers were held for the six Liberté and République-class battleships off Sardinia and Algeria from 21 May to 4 June, followed by exercises with the rest of the Mediterranean Squadron from 7 to 18 June. An outbreak of typhoid among the crews of the battleships in early December forced the navy to confine them to Golfe-Juan to contain the fever. By 15 December, the outbreak had subsided. On 16 April 1911, Liberté and the rest of the fleet escorted Vérité, which had aboard Fallières, the Naval Minister Théophile Delcassé, and Charles Dumont, the Minister of Public Works, Posts and Telegraphs, to Bizerte. They arrived two days later and held a fleet review that included two British battleships, two Italian battleships, and a Spanish cruiser on 19 April. The fleet returned to Toulon on 29 April, where Fallières doubled the crews' rations and suspended any punishments to thank the men for their performance.

By mid-1911, the French naval command reorganized the Mediterranean Squadron, creating the 1st and 2nd Battle Squadrons; Liberté was assigned to the former. The ships of 1st Squadron and the armored cruisers Ernest Renan and Léon Gambetta went on a cruise in the western Mediterranean in May and June, visiting a number of ports including Cagliari, Bizerte, Bône, Philippeville, Algiers, and Bougie. By 1 August, the battleships of the Danton class had begun to enter service, and they were assigned to the 1st Squadron, displacing the Liberté and République-class ships to the 2nd Squadron. On 4 September, both squadrons held a major fleet review for Fallières off Toulon. The fleet then departed on 11 September for maneuvers off Golfe-Juan and Marseille, returning to Toulon on 16 September. The ships remained there for the next nine days.

=== Loss ===
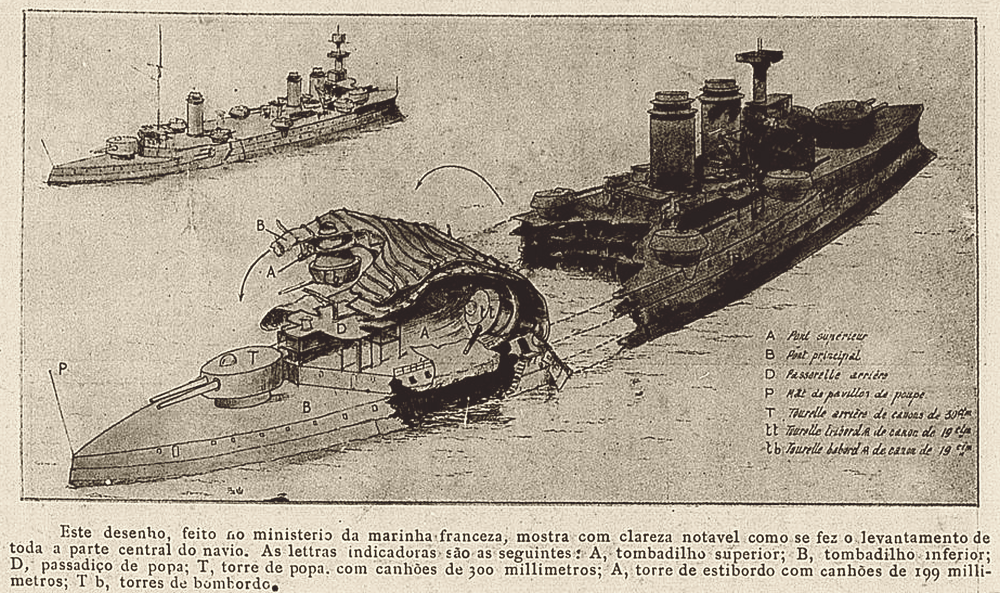
An illustration showing the extent of the damage to Liberté; the darker colored forward section was almost entirely destroyed

At 05:31 on the morning of 25 September, crewmen in other battleships reported seeing smoke coming from Liberté, originating from her forward starboard casemate. Shortly thereafter, the forward superstructure erupted in flames, but it quickly appeared to observers that the ship's crew was getting the fire under control. At 05:53 a tremendous explosion aboard Liberté rocked the harbor. The ship was badly damaged by the blast, with both central 194 mm turrets thrown overboard, the deck amidships collapsed, and the forward 55 m (180 ft) of the ship completely destroyed. The forward 305 mm turret was blasted apart, and only one of the guns was recovered, having been hurled into the muddy bottom of the harbor.

The explosion threw a 37-metric-ton (36-long-ton) chunk of armor plate from the ship into the battleship République moored some 210 m (690 ft) away, which caused significant damage. Splinters from the exploding ship sank a steam pinnace and killed fifteen men aboard the armored cruiser Marseillaise, nine aboard the battleship Saint Louis, six aboard the armored cruiser Léon Gambetta, four aboard the battleship Suffren, and three aboard Démocratie. Liberté's surviving crew immediately fled the ship; 286 were killed in the explosion and 188 were wounded. Fortunately, 143 of the crew, including the ship's commander, had been on leave in Toulon at the time and thus avoided the accident.

The navy convened a commission to investigate the incident on 25 September, which was held aboard Justice; the commission was led by Contre-amiral (Rear Admiral) Jean Gaschard and included officers from Justice. They considered the possibility of sabotage, but ruled it out. The investigation determined that the accident was likely caused by excessive heat in the magazines and deemed that the standard procedures for ammunition monitoring were not sufficient. The French Navy had earlier suffered a series of fatal accidents in Toulon, beginning with an explosion aboard a torpedo boat in February 1907 in which nine men were killed. The following month, the battleship Iéna blew up, killing 107 men. An explosion aboard a gunnery training ship killed six in August 1908, and an explosion on a cruiser killed thirteen in September 1910. Six more men were killed aboard the cruiser Gloire just two weeks before Liberté exploded, on 10 September 1911. The culprit was unstable Poudre B, a nitrocellulose-based propellant that was also responsible for the destruction of Iéna, and possibly the other explosions as well.

Following the disaster, the navy established new rules, requiring that propellant charges older than four years be discarded. The order was initially limited to the battleship squadrons, but was later extended to the entire fleet. The Navy Minister also rescinded an order instructing gun crews to return propellant charges that had misfired to the magazines; going forward, charges that had been placed in the guns would either have to be fired or discarded. The commission had determined that magazine flooding arrangements were insufficient, but the navy made only modest improvements to the equipment. The wreck of the ship remained in Toulon for several years, although work on clearing or marking navigational hazards began immediately. World War I, which lasted from 1914 to 1918, significantly delayed work on refloating the remnants of the hull. The shattered wreck had begun to sink into the mud by 1920, and so extensive work had to be done to prepare it to be refloated, including sending divers to build cofferdams to seal the hull. On 4 September 1920, the old cruiser Latouche-Tréville was fitted with four and later six compressed air pumps and brought alongside to serve as a barracks for the workers and a floating workshop. A pair of submarines and several smaller craft were also used to aid in the recovery effort. On 21 February 1925, Liberté's hull was pumped with compressed air and refloated, before being towed into a drydock in Toulon, where she was broken up.
