= French battleship Gaulois =

French Navy's Charlemagne class pre-dreadnought battleship

- Gaulois

History

France
- Name: Gaulois
- Namesake: Gauls
- Ordered: 22 January 1895
- Builder: Arsenal de Brest
- Laid down: 6 January 1896
- Launched: 6 October 1896
- Completed: 15 January 1899
- Fate: Sunk, 27 December 1916

General characteristics
- Class & type: Charlemagne-class battleship
- Displacement: 11,260 t (11,080 long tons) (normal); 11,415 t (11,235 long tons) (deep load)
- Length: 117.7 m (386 ft 2 in)
- Beam: 20.26 m (66 ft 6 in)
- Draught: 8.4 m (27 ft 7 in)
- Installed power: 20 Belleville boilers; 14,200 PS (10,400 kW)
- Propulsion: 3 × shafts, 3 × triple-expansion steam engines
- Speed: 17 knots (31 km/h; 20 mph)
- Range: 3,776 nautical miles (6,990 km; 4,350 mi) at 10 knots (19 km/h; 12 mph)
- Complement: 692; 750 as flagship
- Armament: 2 × twin 305 mm (12 in) guns; 10 × single 138.6 mm (5.5 in) guns; 8 × single 100 mm (3.9 in) guns; 20 × single 47 mm (1.9 in) guns; 2 × single 37 mm (1.5 in) guns; 4 × 450 mm (17.7 in) torpedo tubes
- Armour: Belt: 110–400 mm (4.3–15.7 in); Decks: 40–70 mm (1.6–2.8 in); Barbettes: 270 mm (10.6 in); Turrets: 320 mm (12.6 in)

Gaulois was one of three Charlemagne-class battleships built for the French Navy (Marine Nationale) in the mid-1890s. Completed in 1899, she spent most of her career assigned to the Mediterranean Squadron (Escadre de la Méditerranée). The ship accidentally rammed two other French warships early in her career, although neither was seriously damaged, nor was Gaulois.

Following the outbreak of World War I in August 1914, Gaulois escorted troop convoys from French North Africa to France for a month and a half. She was ordered to the Dardanelles in November 1914 to guard against a sortie into the Mediterranean by the ex-German battlecruiser Yavuz Sultan Selim. In 1915, Gaulois joined British ships in bombarding Ottoman fortifications. She was badly damaged during one such bombardment in March and had to beach herself to avoid sinking. She was refloated and sent to Toulon for permanent repairs. Gaulois returned to the Dardanelles and covered the Allied evacuation in January 1916. She was en route to the Dardanelles after a refit in France when she was torpedoed and sunk on 27 December by a German submarine; four crewmen were lost.

== Design and description ==
The Charlemagne-class ships were smaller versions of the preceding Bouvet, albeit with an improved armament. They were 117.7 metres (386 ft 2 in) long overall and had a beam of 20.26 metres (66 ft 6 in). At deep load, the ships had a draught of 7.4 metres (24 ft 3 in) forward and 8.4 metres (27 ft 7 in) aft. They displaced 11,260 tonnes (11,080 long tons) normally, and 11,415 tonnes (11,235 long tons) at deep load. When serving as flagships, their crew numbered 750 men, but had 32 officers and 660 ratings as private ships. The ships were powered by three vertical triple-expansion steam engines, each driving one shaft using steam generated by 20 Belleville boilers. These boilers were coal-burning with auxiliary oil sprayers and were designed to produce 14,200 metric horsepower (10,444 kW; 14,006 ihp) to give the Charlemagne class a speed of 17 knots (31 km/h; 20 mph). During her sea trials, Gaulois reached a top speed of 18 knots (33 km/h; 21 mph) from 14,220 metric horsepower (10,459 kW; 14,025 ihp). The ships carried enough coal to give them a range of 3,776 nautical miles (6,993 km; 4,345 mi) at a speed of 10 knots (19 km/h; 12 mph).

The Charlemagnes carried their main battery of four Canon de 305 mm (12 in) Modèle 1893 guns in two twin-gun turrets, one each fore and aft of the superstructure. Their secondary armament consisted of ten Canon de 138.6 mm (5.5 in) Modèle 1893 guns, eight of which were mounted in individual casemates and the remaining pair in shielded mounts on the forecastle deck amidships. They also carried eight Canon de 100 mm (3.9 in) Modèle 1893 guns in open mounts on the superstructure. The ships' anti-torpedo boat defences consisted of twenty Canon de 47 mm (1.9 in) Modèle 1885 and two 37 mm (1.5 in) Maxim guns, fitted in platforms on both masts, on the superstructure, and in casemates in the hull. The ships mounted four 450-millimetre (17.7 in) torpedo tubes, two on each broadside, one submerged and the other above water. As was common with ships of their generation, they were built with a plough-shaped ram.

The Charlemagne-class ships had a complete waterline belt of nickel-steel armour that ranged in thickness from 300 to 400 mm (11.8 to 15.7 in) and was thickest amidships. The armour plates were 2 m (6 ft 7 in) high with the upper 0.5 m (1 ft 8 in) above the design waterline and they tapered to a maximum thickness of 150 mm (5.9 in) at their bottom edges. The thicknesses of the bottom edges of the plates gradually reduced to 134 mm (5.3 in) at the bow and 110 mm (4.3 in) at the stern. The gun turrets were protected by 320 mm (12.6 in) of Harvey armour and their barbettes had 270-millimetre (10.6 in) plates of the same type of armour. The main armoured deck was 70 mm (2.8 in) thick and there was a 40-millimetre-thick (1.6 in) splinter deck below it. The conning tower had a 326-millimetre-thick (12.8 in) face and 276 mm (10.9 in) sides.

== Construction and career ==
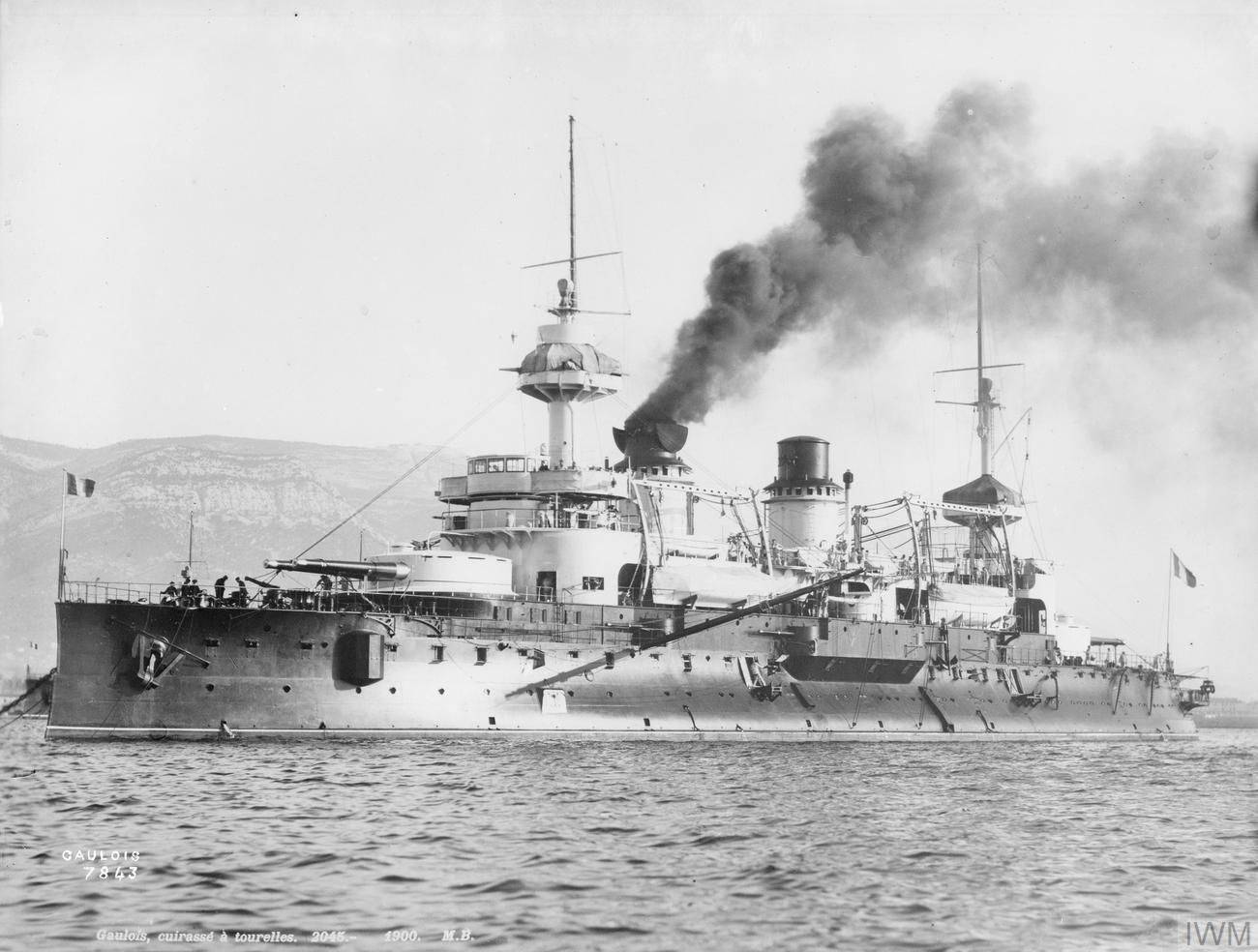
Gaulois in 1900

Gaulois, named after the tribes that inhabited France during Roman times, was ordered on 22 January 1895 from the Arsenal de Brest. Her sister ship Charlemagne was being built in the slipway intended for Gaulois so the latter ship's construction was delayed until the former was launched. Gaulois was laid down on 6 January 1896 and launched on 6 October of the same year. She was commissioned (armement définitif) on 15 January 1899. The ship was initially assigned to the Northern Squadron (Escadre du Nord), but was then assigned to the 1st Battleship Division of the Mediterranean Squadron on 30 September, together with Charlemagne.

The sisters remained based in Brest until they departed for Toulon on 18 January 1900. The following month, while exercising in the harbour at Hyères, Gaulois accidentally rammed the destroyer Hallebarde, gouging a 4-by-1.5-metre (13.1 by 4.9 ft) hole in the smaller ship. Hallebarde reached Toulon where she was repaired, while the battleship was barely damaged. On 18 July, after combined manoeuvres with the Northern Squadron, the ship participated in a naval review conducted by the President of France, Émile Loubet, at Cherbourg. The following year, Gaulois and the Mediterranean Squadron participated in an international naval review by Loubet in Toulon with ships from Spain, Italy and Russia.

In October 1901, the 1st Battleship Division, under the command of Rear-Admiral (contre-amiral) Leonce Caillard, was ordered to proceed to the port of Mytilene on the island of Lesbos, then owned by the Ottoman Empire. After landing two companies of marines that occupied the major ports of the island on 7 November, Sultan Abdul Hamid II agreed to enforce contracts made with French companies and to repay loans made by French banks. The 1st Division departed Lesbos in early December and returned to Toulon. In May 1902, the ship became the flagship of Vice-Admiral (vice-amiral) François Fournier who led a small delegation to celebrate the unveiling of the statue of Comte de Rochambeau in Lafayette Square, Washington, D.C. On 23 May President Theodore Roosevelt was received aboard and the ship visited New York City and Boston before heading back to France. She made another port visit to Lisbon, Portugal, before arriving back at Toulon on 14 June.

During exercises off Golfe-Juan on 31 January 1903, Gaulois accidentally rammed Bouvet. The latter was barely damaged, but Gaulois lost two armour plates from her bow; both captains were relieved of their commands. Captain (Capitaine de vaisseau) Pierre Le Bris assumed command of Gaulois on 20 March. In April 1904, she was one of the ships that escorted Loubet during his state visit to Italy. Later that year, the ship made port visits in Thessaloniki and Athens, Greece, with the rest of the Mediterranean Squadron. A wireless telegraph was installed aboard Gaulois in December 1905. Together with the battleships Iéna and Bouvet, the ship aided survivors of the April 1906 eruption of Mount Vesuvius in Naples, Italy. On 16 September she participated in an international naval review in Marseille, together with British, Spanish and Italian ships.

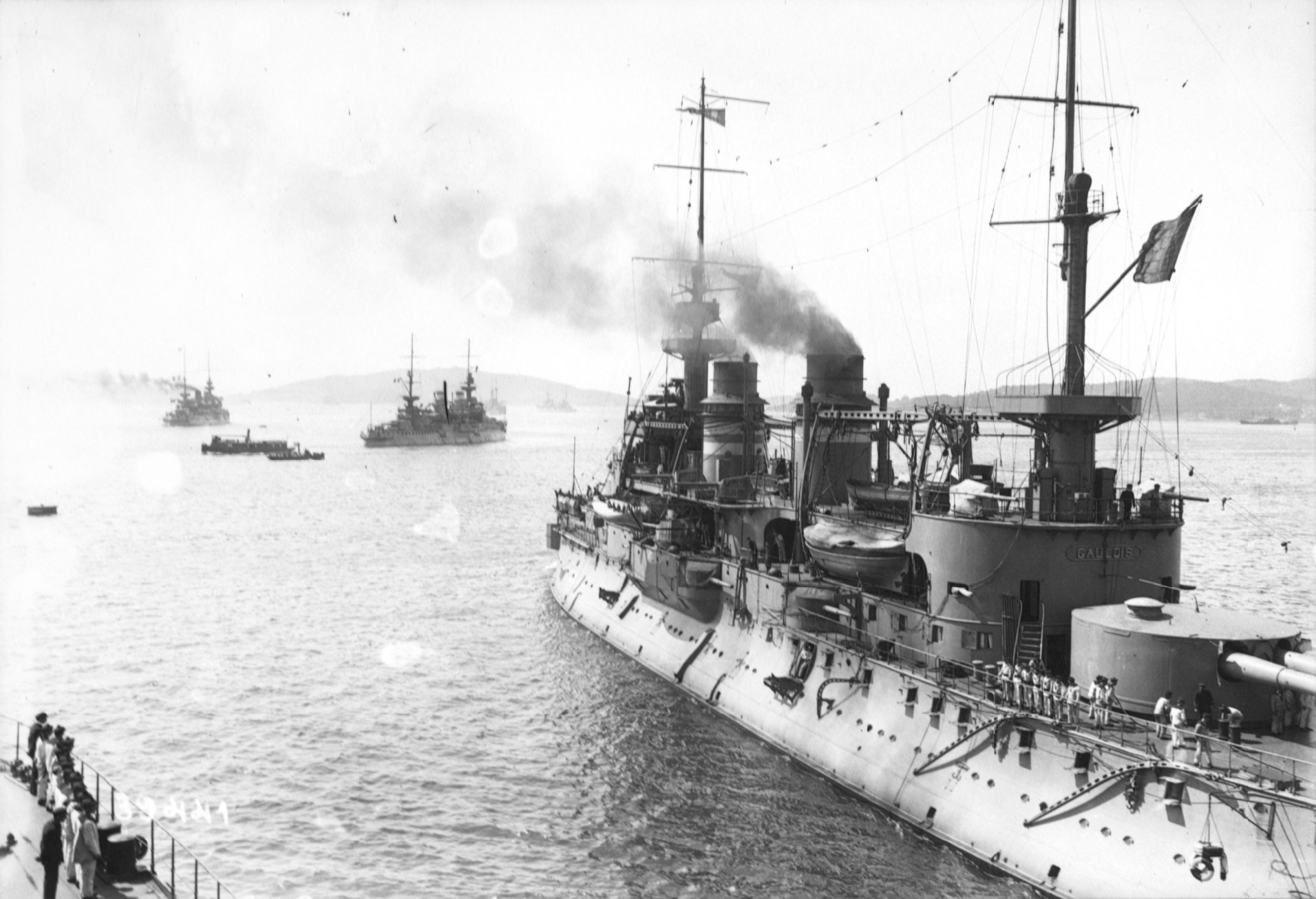
Gaulois in Toulon harbour during the 1914 annual manoeuvres

For the rest of the decade, she participated in exercises with the Mediterranean Squadron and made several port visits in France and its dependencies. In January 1907, the ships was transferred to the 2nd Battleship Division and then to the 4th Battleship Division in July 1908 with her sisters. By 5 January 1909, the 4th Division had been reassigned to the 2nd Battle Squadron (Escadre de ligne). Gaulois sank the target ship Tempête on 18 March after she had been fired upon by four other battleships. By 5 January 1910 the divisions of the battle squadrons had been renumbered and the 4th Division was now the 1st Division of the 2nd Battle Squadron. The squadron was transferred to Brest where it replaced the former Northern Squadron on 27 February. Shortly afterwards, one of Gaulois's torpedoes moderately damaged the bow of the destroyer Fanion while training. On 1 August 1911 the 2nd Battle Squadron was renumbered as the 3rd Battle Squadron and Gaulois participated in a large naval review by President Armand Fallières off Toulon on 4 September. The ship was reassigned to the Mediterranean Squadron on 16 October 1912 and she participated in a naval review by President Raymond Poincaré on 10 June 1913. The 3rd Battle Squadron was dissolved on 11 November 1913 and the ship was assigned to the Complementary Division (Division de complément) together with Bouvet and her sister Saint Louis. In June 1914, the Navy planned to assign Gaulois to the Training Division of the Squadron as of October, but this was cancelled upon the outbreak of war in August.

=== World War I ===
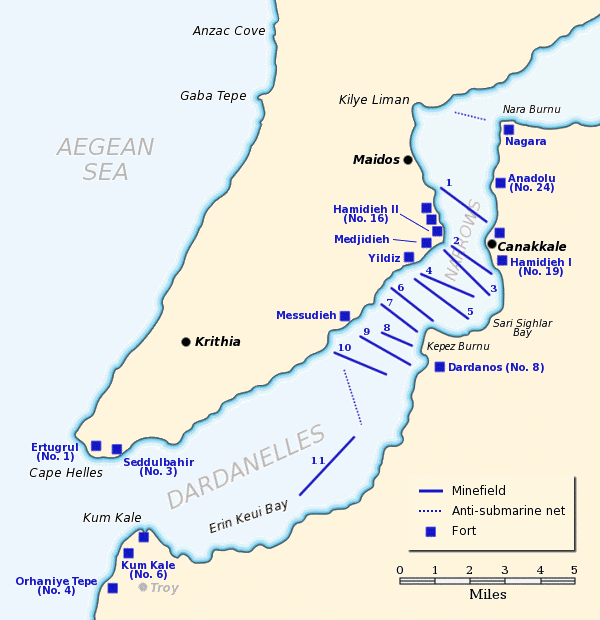
Ottoman defences of the Dardanelles, February–March 1915

Together with the older French pre-dreadnoughts, the ship's first mission in the war was to escort troop convoys from North Africa to France. Later in September, her main turrets required repairs in Bizerte, French Tunisia, as the forward turret was having difficulty traversing. Gaulois was ordered to Tenedos Island, not far from the Ottoman Gallipoli Peninsula, in November to guard against a sortie by the ex-German battlecruiser Yavuz Sultan Selim, relieving the battleship Suffren which needed a refit in Toulon. Gaulois became the flagship of Rear-Admiral Émile Guépratte upon her arrival on 15 November. He transferred his flag back to Suffren when she returned on 10 January 1915.

On 19 February, Gaulois supported Suffren as the latter ship bombarded Ottoman forts covering the mouth of the Dardanelles. Late in the day, Gaulois bombarded the fort at Orhaniye Tepe on the Asian side of the strait. During the subsequent bombardment on 25 February, the ship anchored some 6,000 metres (6,600 yd) from the Asiatic shore and engaged the forts at Kum Kale and Cape Helles. Their return fire was heavy enough to force Gaulois to up anchor before she could suppress their guns. Later in the day, she closed to within 3,000 metres (3,300 yd) of the forts and engaged them with her secondary armament. During the day's action, the ship was hit twice, but these did little damage.

On 2 March, the French squadron bombarded targets in the Gulf of Saros, at the base of the Gallipoli Peninsula. Five days later, the French squadron attempted to suppress the Ottoman guns defending the Dardanelles while British battleships bombarded the fortifications. Gaulois was hit by a 15-centimetre (5.9 in) shell during this attack that caused little damage as it failed to detonate. Guépratte and his squadron returned to the Gulf of Saros on 11 March where they again bombarded Ottoman fortifications.

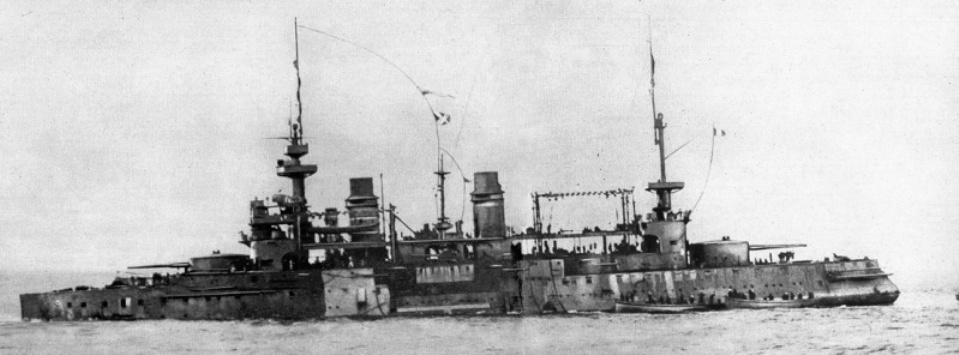
The badly damaged Gaulois making for the Rabbit Islands

They returned to the Dardanelles to assist in the major attack on the fortifications planned for 18 March. British ships made the initial entry into the strait, but the French ships passed through them to engage the forts at closer range. Gaulois was hit twice during this bombardment; the first shell struck the quarterdeck, but caused little damage other than deforming the deck. The second shell hit just above the waterline on the starboard bow and appeared to do little damage, but it had pushed in the armour plates below the waterline and opened up a hole 7 metres (23 ft) by 22 centimetres (8.7 in) through which water flooded. Little could be done to staunch the inflow and Captain André-Casimir Biard decided to head for the Rabbit Islands, north of Tenedos, where he could beach his ship for temporary repairs. He ordered the non-essential crewmen off the ship in case she foundered en route, but managed to reach the islands, escorted by Charlemagne.

Gaulois was refloated on 22 March and departed for Toulon via Malta three days later, escorted by Suffren. They encountered a storm on 27 March off Cape Matapan and the ship began taking on water as the repairs began to leak under the pressure of the storm. She radioed for assistance later that night and the armoured cruiser Jules Ferry and three destroyers arrived several hours later. The ship arrived in the Bay of Navarin the following morning and more repairs were made with the assistance of the crew of the hulked old battleship Marceau. Gaulois arrived without further incident at Toulon on 16 April and entered drydock the following day. The Navy took the opportunity to increase her stability by lightening her masts, removing some armour from the superstructure and conning tower as well as dismounting two 100 mm and six 47 mm guns. The ship was also fitted with anti-torpedo bulges (soufflages) amidships to increase her beam and thus her stability.

Her repairs were completed by early June and Gaulois departed for the Dardanelles on 8 June. She reached Lemnos on 17 June and relieved Saint Louis on 27 July. The ship anchored 1,000 metres (1,100 yd) off the shore on 11 August to bombard an Ottoman artillery battery at Achi Baba. Splinters from return fire detonated a 100 mm shell and started a small fire, but it was put out without much trouble. On her voyage home, Gaulois ran aground at the harbour entrance and had to unload most of her ammunition before she could be refloated on 21 August. Together with the pre-dreadnought République, the ship covered the Allied evacuation from Gallipoli in January 1916. Badly in need of a refit, she sailed for Brest on 20 July where her captain argued that the range of her main armament needed to be increased by 4,000 metres (4,400 yd) if she was to be considered fit for the battleline. Some thought was given to disarming her and converting her into a barracks ship, but nothing was done before the ship was ordered back to the Eastern Mediterranean on 25 November.

==== Fate ====
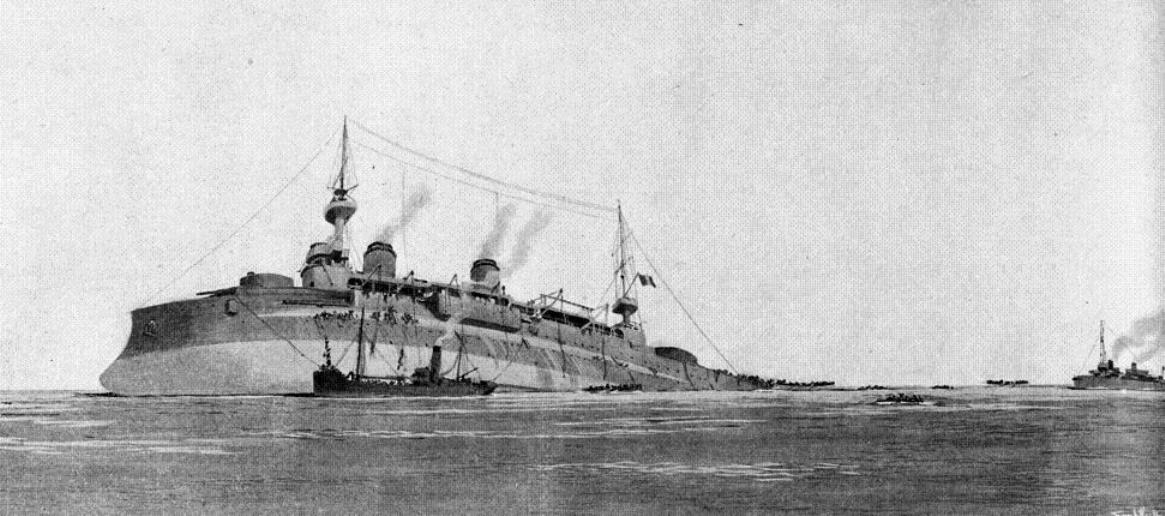
A drawing of the sinking Gaulois with the trawlers taking off the crew

By 27 December, Gaulois had reached the Sea of Crete and was off the southern coast of Greece when she was torpedoed by the German submarine UB-47 at 08:03 despite being escorted by the destroyer Dard and two armed trawlers. The single torpedo hit slightly abaft the mainmast and started uncontrollable flooding below the waterline. It killed two crewmen and another pair drowned as they attempted to abandon ship; the rest of the crew was successfully rescued. The ship capsized at 09:03 and sank eight minutes later off Cape Maleas at 36°15′N 23°42′E in 480–500 metres (1,570–1,640 ft) of water.

== Bibliography ==
- Campbell, N.J.M. (1979). "France". In Gardiner, Robert (ed.). Conway's All the World's Fighting Ships 1860–1905. Greenwich, UK: Conway Maritime Press. pp. 283–333. ISBN 0-85177-133-5.
- Caresse, Philippe (2012). "The Battleship Gaulois". In Jordan, John (ed.). Warship 2012. London: Conway. ISBN 978-1-84486-156-9.
- Corbett, Julian (1997). Naval Operations. History of the Great War: Based on Official Documents. Vol. II (reprint of the 1929 second ed.). London; Nashville, Tennessee: Imperial War Museum in association with the Battery Press. ISBN 978-1-870423-74-8.
- Gille, Eric (1999). Cent ans de cuirassés français [A Century of French Battleships] (in French). Nantes: Marines édition. ISBN 2-909-675-50-5.
- Jordan, John & Caresse, Philippe (2017). French Battleships of World War One. Annapolis, Maryland: Naval Institute Press. ISBN 978-1-59114-639-1.
- Silverstone, Paul H. (1984). Directory of the World's Capital Ships. New York: Hippocrene Books. ISBN 0-88254-979-0.
- Taillemite, Étienne (2002). Dictionnaire des marins français [Dictionary of French Sailors] (in French) (Nouv. éd. rev. et augmentée [Revised and expanded] ed.). Paris: Tallandier. ISBN 978-2-84734-008-2.
