= Canon de 32 modèle 1870/93 =

Railway gun used by the French Army

Canon de 32 modèle 1870/93 à glissement
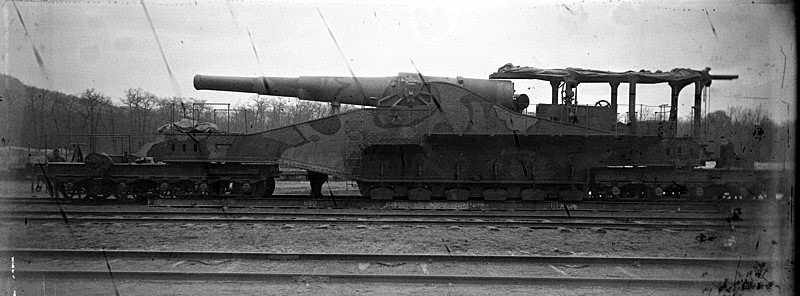
- A 32 cm mle 1870/93 near Condé-sur-Aisne, France 1918.
- Type: Railway gun
- Place of origin: France

Service history
- In service: 1916–1945
- Used by: France; Nazi Germany
- Wars: World War I World War II

Production history
- Designer: Schneider
- Designed: 1915
- Manufacturer: Schneider
- Produced: 1915
- No. built: 6

Specifications
- Mass: 162 t (159 long tons; 179 short tons)
- Length: 26 m (85 ft)
- Barrel length: 10.4 m (34 ft) L/32
- Shell: Separate loading bagged charges and projectiles
- Shell weight: 388 kg (855 lb)
- Caliber: 32 cm (13 in)
- Breech: Interrupted screw breech
- Recoil: Sliding recoil
- Carriage: Two five-axle rail bogies
- Elevation: +3° to +40°
- Traverse: None
- Rate of fire: 1 round every four minutes
- Muzzle velocity: 675 m/s (2,210 ft/s)
- Maximum firing range: 21.6 km (13 mi)

The Canon de 32 modèle 1870/93 à glissement was a French railway gun used by the French Army during World War I and World War II.

== History ==
Although the majority of combatants had heavy field artillery prior to the outbreak of the First World War, none had adequate numbers of heavy guns in service, nor had they foreseen the growing importance of heavy artillery once the Western Front stagnated and trench warfare set in. Since aircraft of the period were not yet capable of carrying large diameter bombs, the burden of delivering heavy firepower fell on the artillery. Two sources of heavy artillery suitable for conversion to field use were surplus coastal defense guns and naval guns.

However, artillery designers of the time were faced with a paradox: while large caliber naval guns were common, large caliber land weapons were not due to their weight, complexity, and lack of mobility. Large caliber field guns often required extensive site preparation because the guns had to be broken down into multiple loads light enough to be towed by a horse team or the few traction engines of the time and then reassembled before use. Building a new gun could address the problem of disassembling, transporting and reassembling a large gun, but it did not necessarily address how to convert existing heavy weapons to make them more mobile. Rail transport proved to be the most practical solution because the problems of heavy weight, lack of mobility and reduced setup time were addressed.

== Design ==
The Canon de 32 modèle 1870/93 à glissement started life as six Canon de 32C modèle 1870/93 coastal defense guns which were converted to railway guns. The guns were typical built-up guns of the period with mixed construction consisting of a rifled steel liner and several layers of iron reinforcing hoops. In French service guns of mixed steel/iron construction were designated in centimeters while all steel guns were designated in millimeters. However, reference materials don't always distinguish the difference in construction and use either unit of measurement. The guns used an interrupted screw breech and fired separate loading bagged charges and projectiles. Since the barrels were coastal defense guns that were not intended for use at high angles of elevation the trunnions were relocated relatively far forward and the guns were nose heavy.

The carriages consisted of a large rectangular steel base, which was suspended on two five-axle railroad bogies manufactured by Schneider. The number of axles was determined by the weight limit for European railways of 17 tonnes per axle. The guns could be elevated from 0 to +40° with typical firing range being between +22° and +40°. To load the gun the barrel was lowered and an elevated loading shell hoist could be erected. The guns had no traversing mechanism and in order to aim the guns were drawn across a curved section of track. Once in position, a section of rail bed was reinforced with wooden beams then six steel beams under the center of the carriage were lowered onto the tracks and the carriage was jacked up to bear the weight of the gun. The guns used a sliding recoil or Glissement system and when fired the gun slid back a few meters and was then pushed back into position. The friction between the steel beams and the track limited the length of recoil. Due to their low cost and simplicity Schneider carriages were widely used on early railway guns. Although stable and effective this form of carriage was crude and latter guns incorporated improved recoil, elevation and traverse mechanisms.

== Similar guns ==
There were three models of 32 cm coastal defense guns that were converted by Schneider to railway artillery during the First World War the Canon de 32 modèle 1870/81, Canon de 32 modèle 1870/84, and Canon de 32 modèle 1870/93. The longer barreled guns had better range and the mle 1870/81's were scrapped after the war. The remaining long barrelled guns were place in reserve between the wars were redesignated Canon de 320 G modèle 70/30.

Coastal gun designation	Barrel length	Range	Number converted
Canon de 32C modèle 1870/81 M	8.5 m (28 ft) L/26	16.4 km (10 mi)	16
Canon de 32C modèle 1870/84 M	10.4 m (34 ft) L/32	21.6 km (13 mi)	30
Canon de 32C modèle 1870/93 M	10.4 m (34 ft) L/32	21.6 km (13 mi)	6

In addition to the former coastal defense guns mentioned above, there were two other models of 320 mm guns. However, these were converted 305 mm (12 in) naval guns that were rebored once their barrels wore out. They were delivered late in 1918-1919 and given new designations and placed in reserve between the wars.

- Canon de 305 modèle 1893/96 à berceau - Eight barrels were rebored by Batignolles and were redesignated Canon de 320 modèle 1917 à berceau and placed in reserve between the wars. Eight were mobilized by the French Army during the Second World War. Guns captured by the Germans after the Fall of France were given the designation 32 cm Kanone (Eisenbahn) 652(f).
- Canon de 305 modèle 1893/96 à glissement - Eight barrels were rebored by Schneider and were redesignated Canon de 320 modèle 1917 à glissement and placed in reserve between the wars. Eight were mobilized by the French Army during the Second World War. Guns captured by the Germans after the Fall of France were given the designation 32 cm Kanone (Eisenbahn) 651/1(f).

Naval gun designation	Barrel length	Range	Number converted
Canon de 305 modèle 1893/96	12.2 m (40 ft) L/40	27 km (17 mi)	8
Canon de 305 modèle 1893/96	12.2 m (40 ft) L/40	30 km (19 mi)	8

== Identification ==
Identifying the different models of 32 cm and 320 mm guns can be difficult because of poor quality images, the angle of the photo and the similarity of their carriages. However, there are a few distinguishing marks on the barrels and carriage that aid identification.

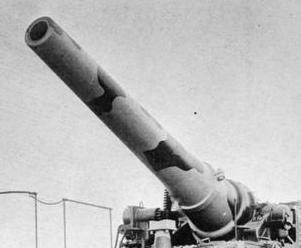
The mle 1870/81 had a smooth barrel with a few hoops around the trunnion and breech.

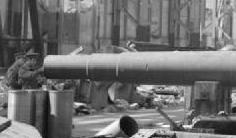
The most common version of mle 1870/84 had three hoops near the muzzle.

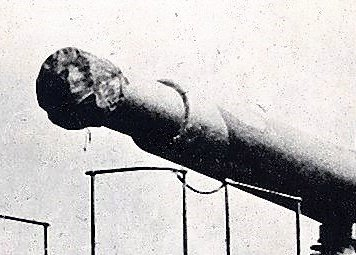
There was another mle 1870/84 variant that had only one reinforcing hoop near the muzzle.

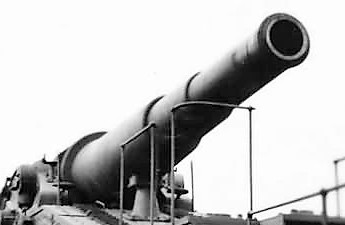
The mle 1870/93 had three evenly spaced hoops along the barrel.

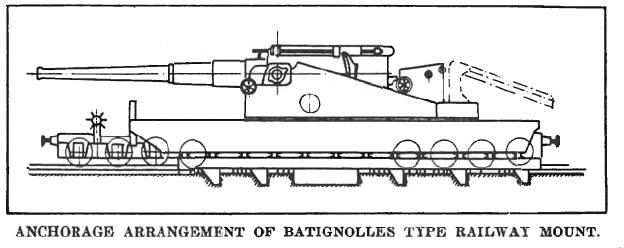
The 305 mle 1893/96 à berceau used cradle recoil and a different anchoring system. The 320 mm conversion did not change its appearance.

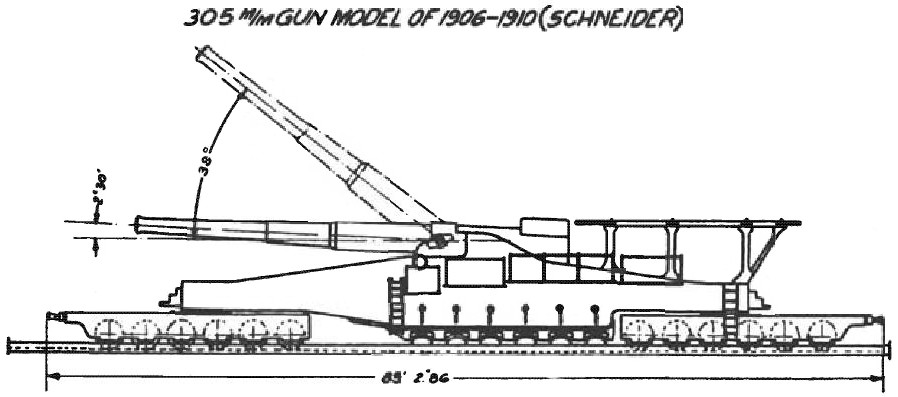
The 305 mle 1893/96 à glissement can be identified by its six-axle bogies. The 320 mm conversion did not change its appearance.

== World War II ==
At the outbreak of the Second World War, eight guns were assigned to the 7th and 8th battery of Heavy Artillery Regiment 373° of the ALVF (Artillerie Lourde sur Voie Ferrée). The four guns of the 7th were held in reserve at Seppois-le-Haut and later at positions near Hirtzbach, France. The four guns of the 8th were held in reserve at Seppois-le-Haut and later at positions near Steinsoultz, France. After the Fall of France, nine guns captured by the Germans were given the designation 32 cm K(E) 657(f) and used by them during World War II.

== Gallery ==
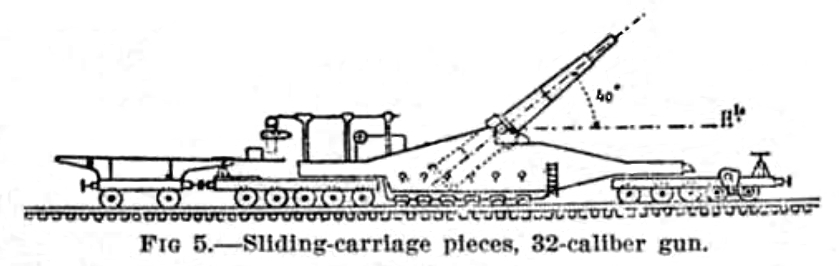
A diagram of the Schneider carriage system.

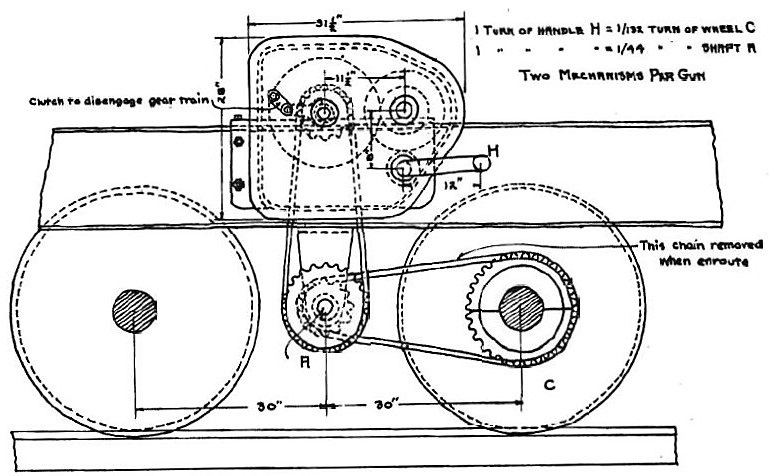
The windlass between the first and second axle on the front bogie to pull the gun back into position after firing.

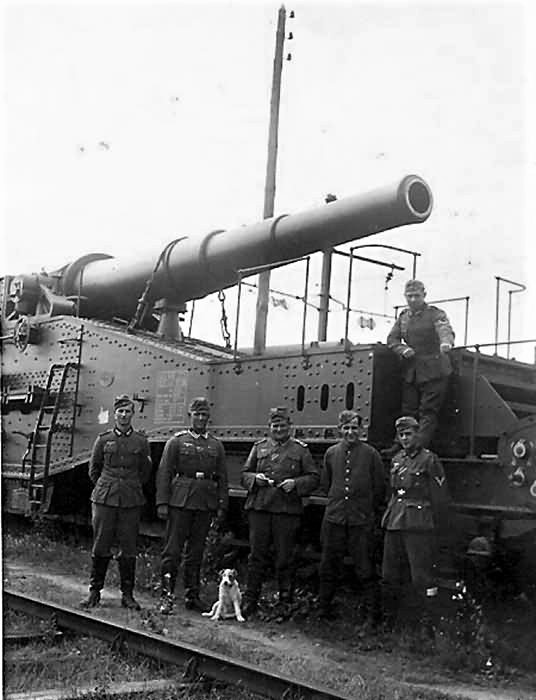
A mle 1870/93 captured by the Germans.

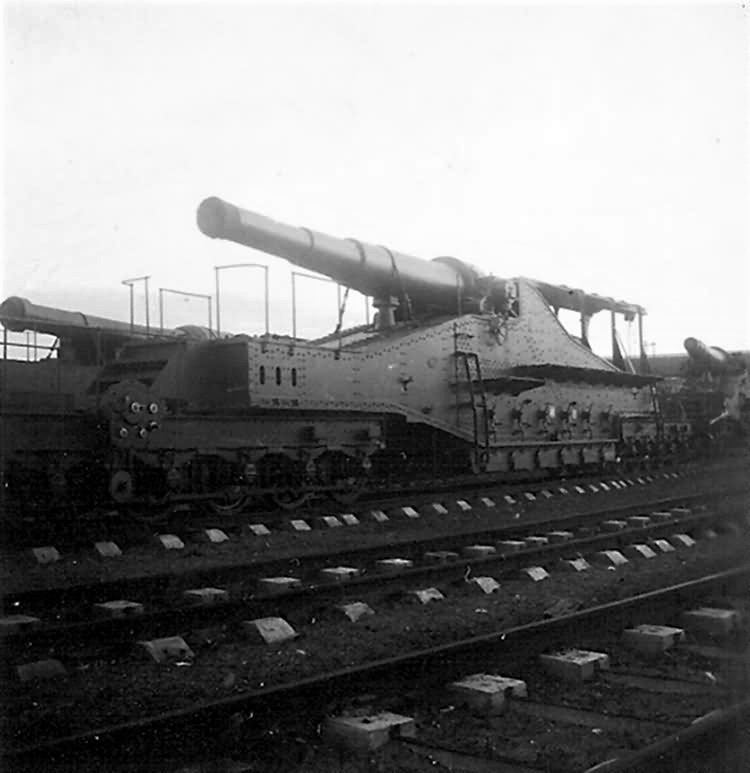
A mle 1870/93 in a group of captured French guns.

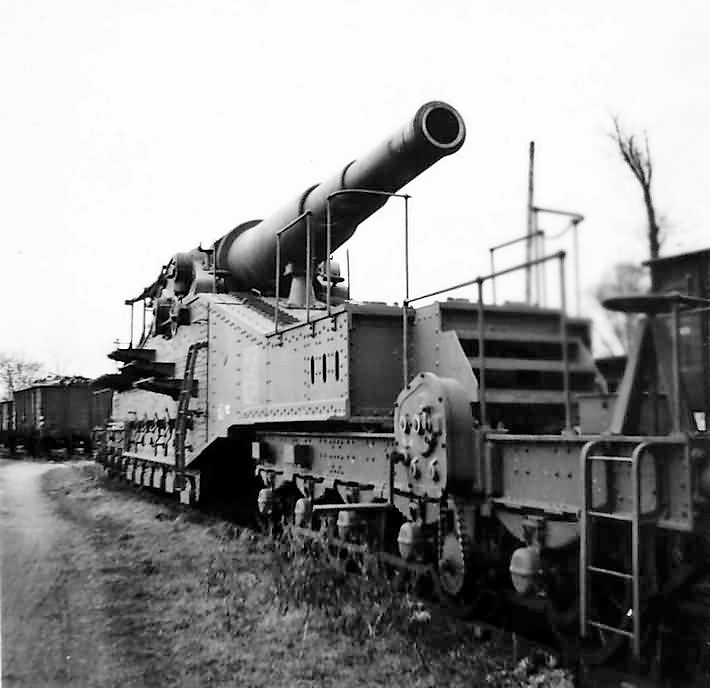
A mle 1870/93 captured from the Germans.
