= Canon de 305 modèle 1893/96 à glissement =

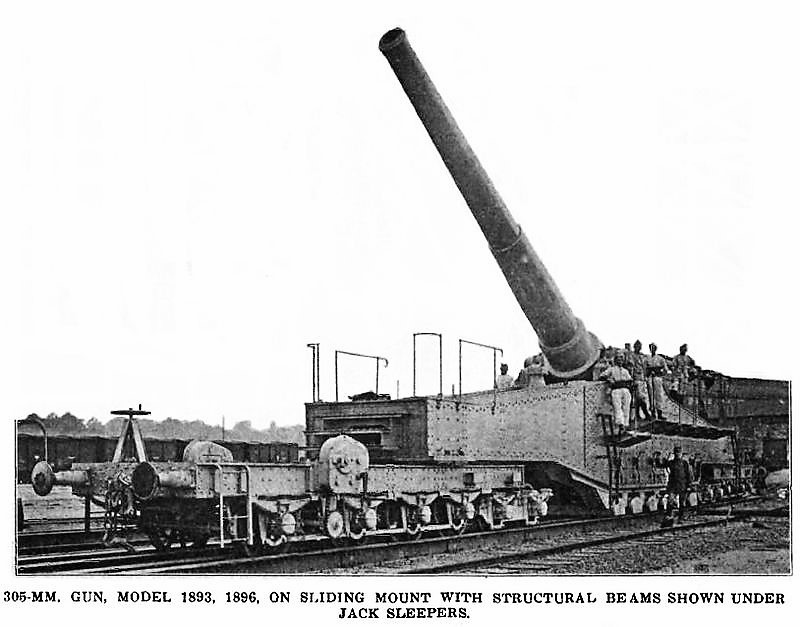
- Type: Railway gun
- Place of origin: France

Service history
- In service: 1916–1945
- Used by: France; Nazi Germany
- Wars: World War I World War II

Production history
- Designer: Schneider
- Designed: 1915
- Manufacturer: Schneider
- Produced: 1916
- No. built: 8
- Variants: Canon de 320 modèle 1917 à glissement

Specifications
- Mass: 175 t (172 long tons; 193 short tons)
- Length: 27.2 m (89 ft)
- Barrel length: 12.2 m (40 ft) L/40
- Shell: Separate loading bagged charges and projectiles
- Caliber: 305 mm (12 in)
- Breech: Interrupted screw breech
- Recoil: Carriage recoil
- Carriage: Two six-axle rail bogies
- Elevation: +2 to +38°
- Traverse: None
- Rate of fire: 1 round every five minutes
- Muzzle velocity: 795 m/s (2,610 ft/s)
- Maximum firing range: 30 km (19 mi)

The Canon de 305 modèle 1893/96 à glissement was a French railway gun that saw action during World War I. These guns were rebored late in the war and held in reserve between the wars then mobilized by France during World War II.

== History ==
Although the majority of combatants had heavy field artillery prior to the outbreak of the First World War, none had adequate numbers of heavy guns in service, nor had they foreseen the growing importance of heavy artillery once the Western Front stagnated and trench warfare set in. Since aircraft of the period were not yet capable of carrying large diameter bombs the burden of delivering heavy firepower fell on the artillery. Two sources of heavy artillery suitable for conversion to field use were surplus coastal defense guns and naval guns.

However, a paradox faced artillery designers of the time; while large caliber naval guns were common, large caliber land weapons were not due to their weight, complexity, and lack of mobility. Large caliber field guns often required extensive site preparation because the guns had to be broken down into multiple loads light enough to be towed by a horse team or the few traction engines of the time and then reassembled before use. Building a new gun could address the problem of disassembling, transporting and reassembling a large gun, but it did not necessarily address how to convert existing heavy weapons to make them more mobile. Rail transport proved to be the most practical solution because the problems of heavy weight, lack of mobility and reduced setup time were addressed.

== Design ==
The Canon de 305 modèle 1893/96 à glissement started life as eight surplus Canon de 305 mm Modèle 1893/96 naval guns which armed pre-dreadnought battleships of the Charlemagne, République, and Liberté classes. The guns were typical built-up guns of the period which consisted of a rifled liner reinforced by layers of hoops. The guns used a Welin interrupted screw breech and fired separate loading bagged charges and projectiles. To load the gun the barrel was lowered to +3° and there was an elevated shell handling trolley at the rear.

The eight guns for the Canon de 305 modèle 1893/96 à glissement were first deployed as the Canon de 305 modèle 93/96 TAZ built by St. Chamond. The guns were removed from that chassis because the elevation was too low, the range was poor, balance was poor and the recoil forces were too great for that carriage to handle. In order to produce a better weapon, the 305 mm (12 in) guns were replaced with eight smaller 240 mm (9.4 in) Canon de 240 de côte modèle 1893 coastal defense guns to produce the Canon de 240 modèle 93/96 TAZ.

The carriages consisted of a large rectangular steel base, which was suspended on two six-axle articulated rail bogies manufactured by Schneider. The number of axles was determined by the weight limit for European railways of 17 tonnes per axle. The carriage was similar to that used by the contemporary Canon de 370 modèle 75/79 Glissement produced by Schneider. Since the carriage did not have a traversing mechanism it was aimed by drawing the guns across a section of curved track. Once in firing position, a section of rail bed was reinforced with wood and iron beams to support the weight of the gun. Six steel beams under the center of the carriage were then lowered to lay across the tracks and the carriage was jacked up to take the weight off the bogies and anchor the gun in place. When the gun fired the entire carriage recoiled a few feet and was stopped by the friction of the beams on the tracks. The carriage was then lowered onto its axles and was either pushed back into place with a shunting locomotive or a windlass mounted on the front of the carriage pulled the carriage back into position. This cheap, simple and effective system came to characterize Schneider's railway guns during the later war years and is known as the Glissement system.

== World War I ==
The Canon de 305 modèle 1893/96 à glissement first saw action during the Nivelle Offensive in the Spring of 1917 and the Flanders Offensive in mid-1917. They also saw action during the German spring offensive of 1918 and during the Hundred Days Offensive in mid-1918. After the barrels became worn out they were returned to Schneider and bored out to fire 320 mm (13 in) ammunition during 1918–1919 and were designated Canon de 320 modèle 1917 à glissement. These were placed in reserve between the wars.

== World War II ==
Eight Canon de 320 modèle 1917 à glissement guns were mobilized at the beginning of the Second World War by the French Army. Four guns were assigned to the Fourth Heavy Artillery Battery of the 372° Regiment of the ALVF (Artillerie Lourde sur Voie Ferrée) stationed at Aboncourt. The four guns were named (Sneezy, Dopey, Happy and Grumpy) after characters of Snow White and the Seven Dwarfs. Four guns were assigned to the Tenth Heavy Artillery Battery of the 373° Regiment of the ALVF stationed at Reguisheim. Guns captured by the Germans after the Fall of France were given the designation 32 cm Kanone (Eisenbahn) 651/1(f).

== Ammunition ==
- APC (Armor Piercing Capped) - 340 kg (750 lb)
- CI (Common Incendiary) - 292 kg (644 lb)
- SAPC (Semi-Armor Piercing Capped) - 340 kg (750 lb)

== Gallery ==
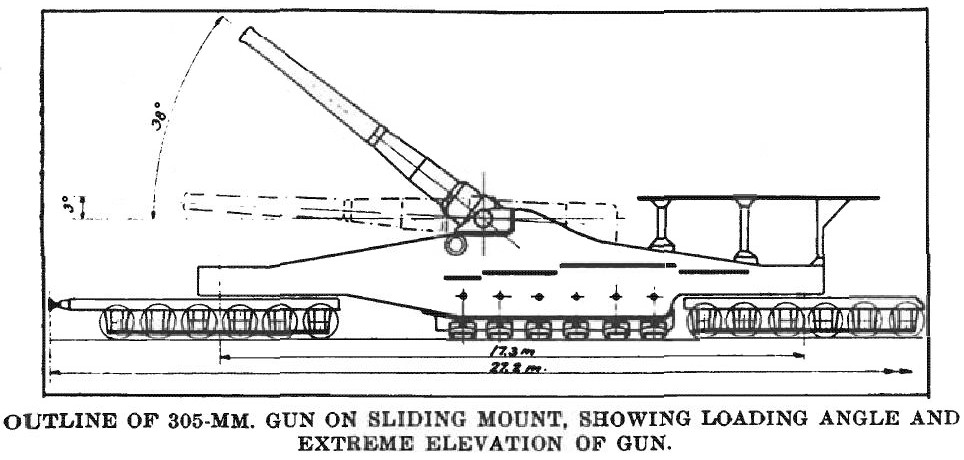
A diagram of the chassis components.

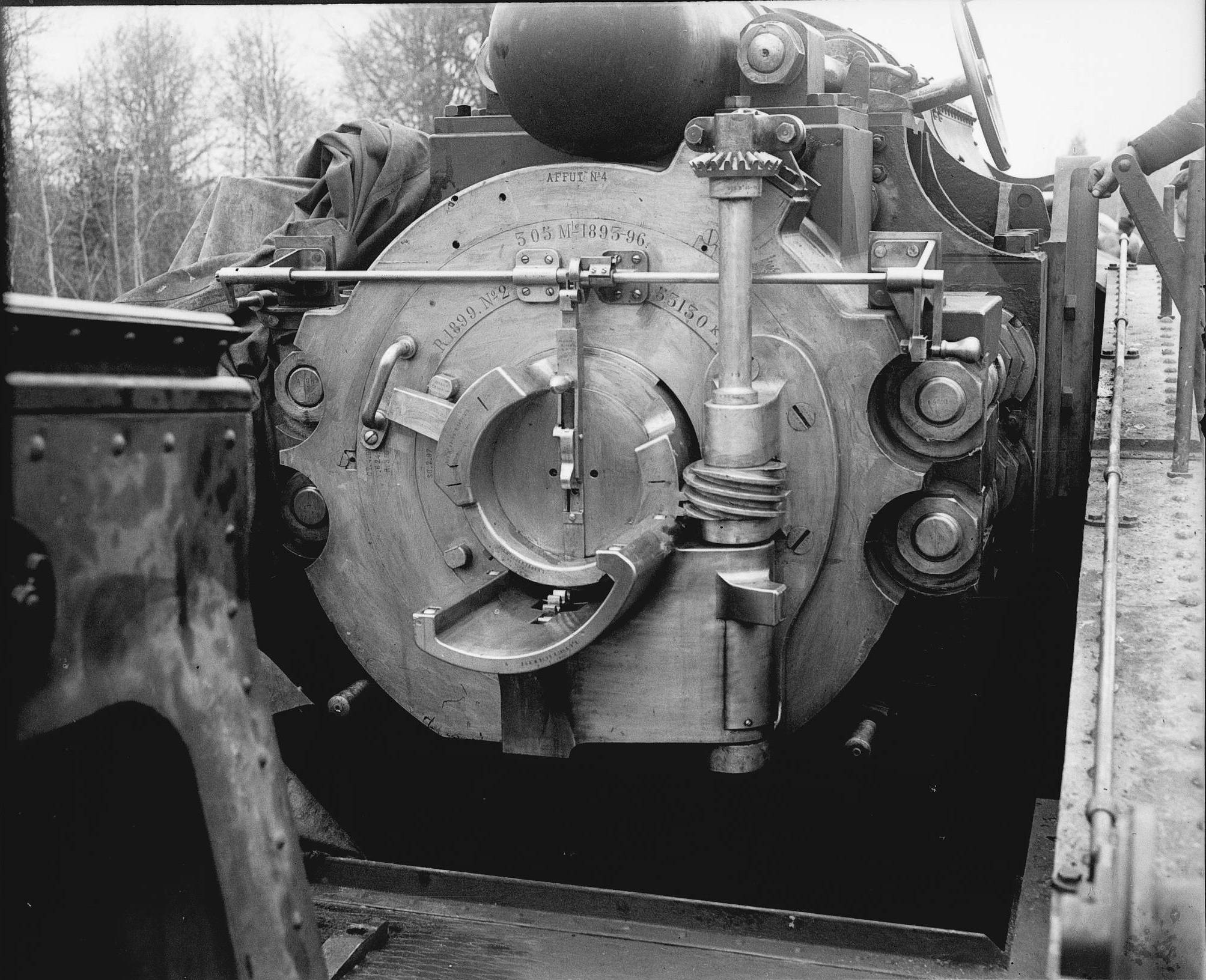
The breech of a 1893/96 gun.

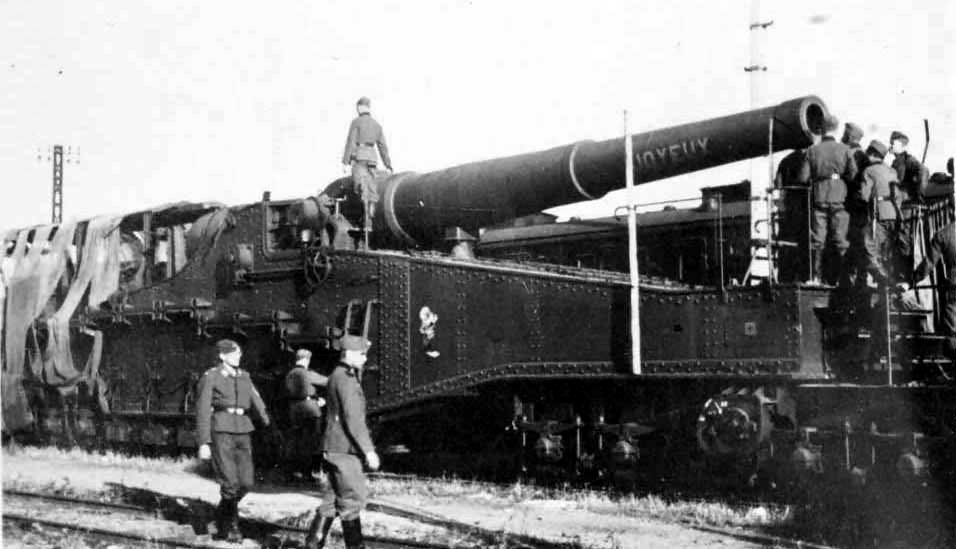
A 320mm mle 1917 named Joyeux in German service.

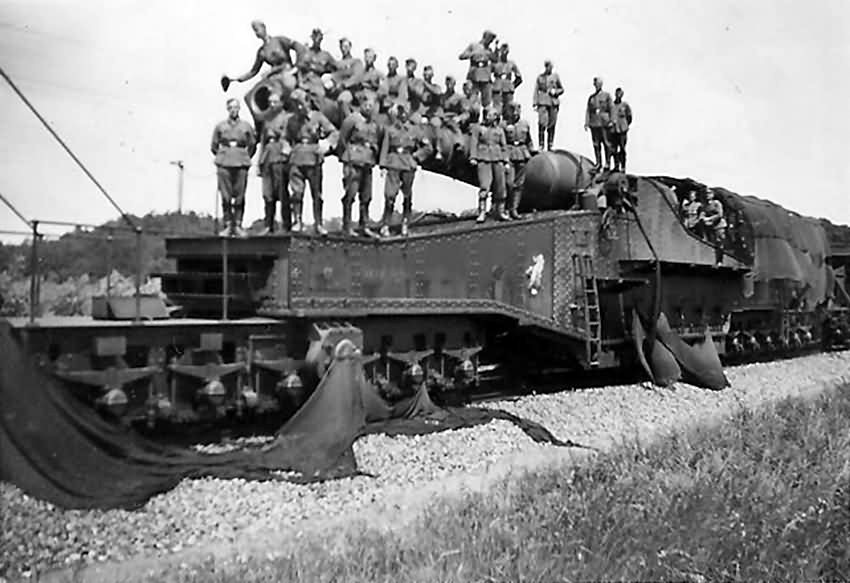
A 320 mm mle 1917 in German service.
