= Steinsoultz =

Commune in Grand Est, France

- Commune
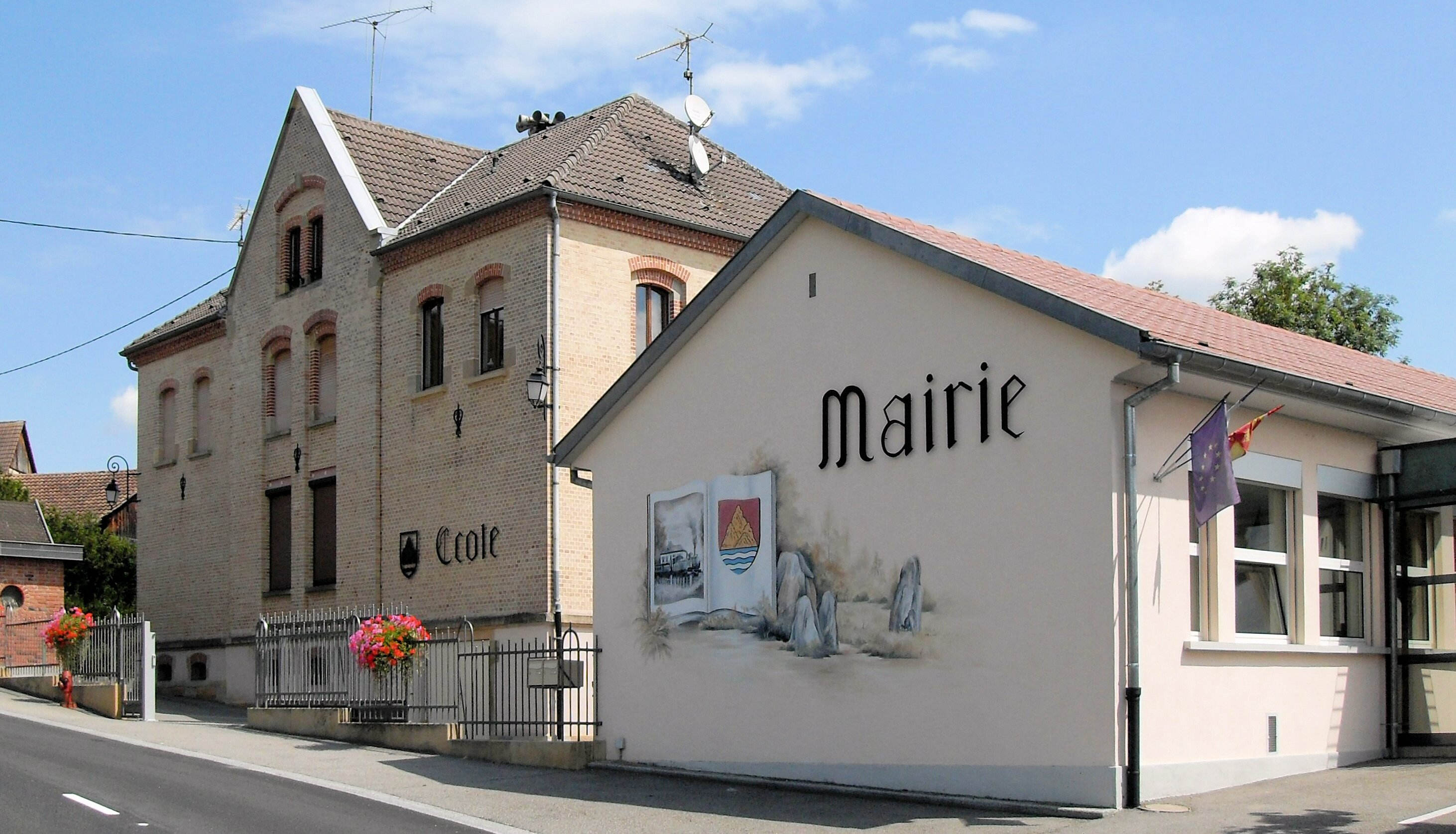
- The town hall and school in Steinsoultz

- Coat of arms
- Location of Steinsoultz
- Location within France Location within Grand Est
- Coordinates: 47°33′16″N 7°20′18″E
- Country: France
- Region: Grand Est
- Department: Haut-Rhin
- Arrondissement: Altkirch
- Canton: Altkirch

Government
  - Mayor (2020–2026): Stéphane Stallini
- Area^{1}: 4.06 km^{2} (1.57 sq mi)
- Elevation: 400 m (1,300 ft)
- Highest elevation: 442 m (1,450 ft)
- Lowest elevation: 353 m (1,158 ft)
- Population (2023): 743
  - Density: 183/km^{2} (474/sq mi)
- Time zone: UTC+01:00 (CET)
  - Summer (DST): UTC+02:00 (CEST)
- INSEE/Postal code: 68325 /68640
- ^{1} French Land Register data, which excludes lakes, ponds, glaciers > 1 km^{2} (0.386 sq mi or 247 acres) and river estuaries.

Steinsoultz (German: Steinsulz) is a commune in the Haut-Rhin department in Alsace in north-eastern France.

== See also ==
- Communes of the Haut-Rhin department
