= Canon de 305 modèle 1893/96 à berceau =

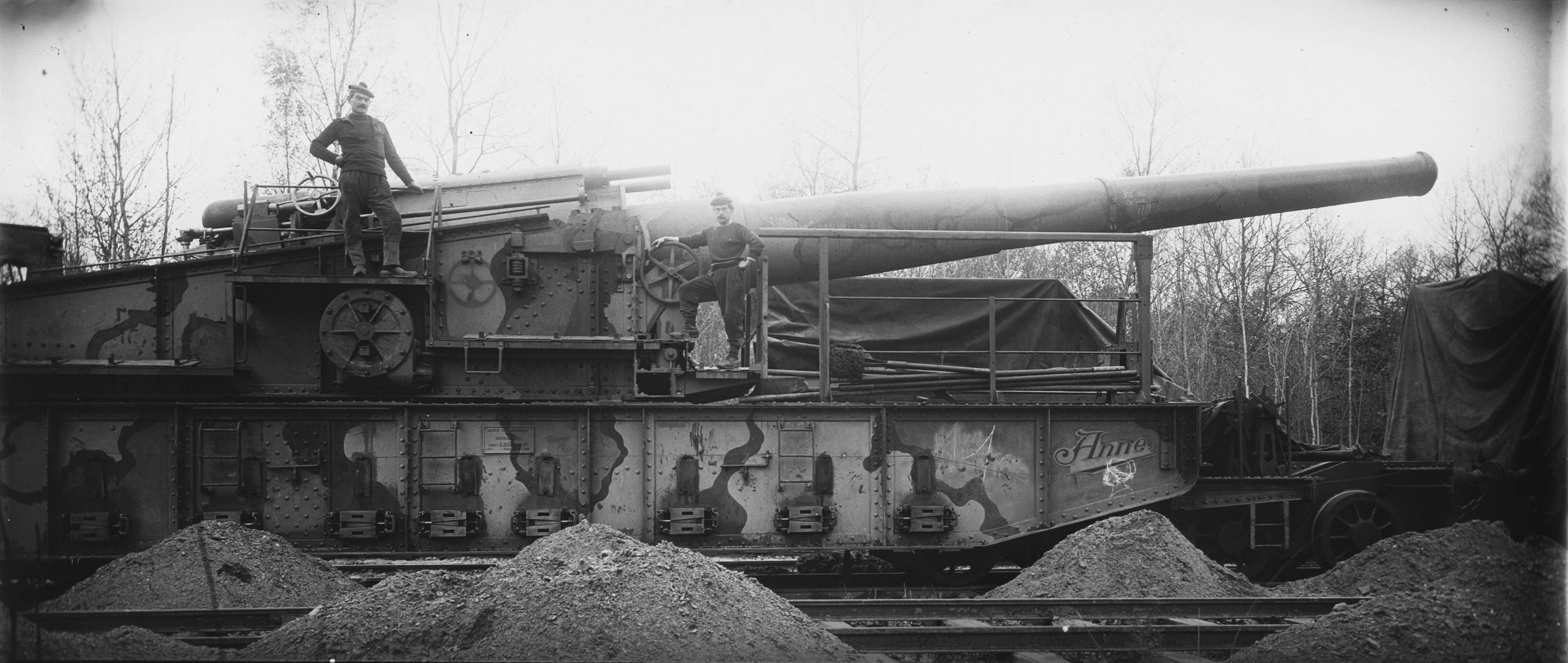
- Two marines on a Canon de 305 modèle 1893/96 à berceau named Anne at Mont-Notre-Dame in 1917.
- Type: Railway gun
- Place of origin: France

Service history
- In service: 1916–1945
- Used by: France; Nazi Germany
- Wars: World War I World War II

Production history
- Designer: Batignolles
- Designed: 1915
- Manufacturer: Batignolles
- Produced: 1916
- No. built: 8
- Variants: Canon de 320 modèle 1917 à berceau

Specifications
- Mass: 140 t (140 long tons; 150 short tons)
- Barrel length: 12.2 m (40 ft) L/40
- Shell: Separate loading bagged charges and projectiles
- Caliber: 305 mm (12 in)
- Breech: Welin breech block
- Recoil: Hydro-pneumatic cradle recoil
- Carriage: 2 railroad bogies, 4 axles each
- Elevation: -6° to +38°
- Traverse: 10°
- Rate of fire: 1 round every 6 minutes
- Muzzle velocity: 795 m/s (2,610 ft/s)
- Effective firing range: 27 km (17 mi)

The Canon de 305 modèle 1893/96 à berceau was a French railroad gun that saw action during the First and Second World Wars.

== History ==
Although the majority of combatants had heavy field artillery prior to the outbreak of the First World War, none had adequate numbers of heavy guns in service, nor had they foreseen the growing importance of heavy artillery once the Western Front stagnated and trench warfare set in. Since aircraft of the period were not yet capable of carrying large diameter bombs the burden of delivering heavy firepower fell on the artillery. Two sources of heavy artillery suitable for conversion to field use were surplus coastal defense guns and naval guns.

However, a paradox faced artillery designers of the time, while large caliber naval guns were common, large caliber land weapons were less common due to their weight, complexity, and lack of mobility. Large caliber field guns often required extensive site preparation because the guns had to be broken down into multiple loads light enough to be towed by a horse team or the few traction engines of the time and then reassembled before use. Building a new gun could address the problem of disassembling, transporting and reassembling a large gun, but it didn't necessarily address how to convert existing heavy weapons to make them more mobile. Rail transport proved to be the most practical solution because the problems of heavy weight, lack of mobility and reduced setup time were addressed.

== Design ==
The Canon de 305 modèle 1893/96 à berceau started life as eight Canon de 305 mm Modèle 1893/96 naval guns salvaged from two pre-dreadnought battleships the Iéna and Liberté that sank after suffering internal explosions while in port. The guns were typical built-up guns of the period which consisted of a rifled liner reinforced by layers of hoops. The guns used a Welin interrupted screw breech and fired separate loading bagged charges and projectiles. To load the gun the barrel was lowered to -6° and there was a collapsible shell handling trolley at the rear.

Each gun sat on a rectangular steel base which was suspended from two railroad bogies with four axles each. The number of axles was determined by the weight limit for European railways of 17 tonnes per axle. The howitzers had a hydro-pneumatic cradle recoil system with two recoil cylinders below the barrel and one recuperator on top. When the gun fired the cradle recoiled up a slightly inclined rear deck which helped return the howitzer to battery after firing.

The guns were mounted on Berceau style rail mounts produced by Batignolles which consisted of five steel cross ties with integral spades which were driven between the railroad ties. On top of these steel ties, two heavy girders were laid parallel to the tracks which bolted to the ties. The girders were equipped with 12 sets of flanges that matched the same number on the carriage. When the carriage was over the flanges the carriage was fastened to the girders and the ties. Once the platform was ready, the piece could be anchored in minutes and ready to fire. The ties and girders supported the weight of the carriage and absorbed the gun's recoil, the track did not have to be reinforced. A pit was also dug under the gun's breech and lined with a steel box to allow the gun to recoil at high angles of elevation, which took about 3 hours. The Batignolles mounts also employed car-traverse which allowed for limited traverse by shifting the carriage on its bogies. When the United States entered the First World War a license to produce Berceau style rail mounts was negotiated with Batignolles and the carriage used by the 12-inch M1895 railway gun was similar.

== World War I ==
After the barrels became worn out they were bored out to fire 320 mm (13 in) ammunition during 1918–1919 and were designated Canon de 320 modèle 1917 à berceau. These were placed in reserve between the wars.

== World War II ==
Eight Canon de 320 modèle 1917 à berceau were mobilized by the French Army during the Second World War. The Germans gave them the designation 32 cm Kanone (Eisenbahn) 652 (f).

== Ammunition ==
- APC (Armor Piercing Capped) - 340 kg (750 lb)
- CI (Common Incendiary) - 292 kg (644 lb)
- SAPC (Semi-Armor Piercing Capped) - 340 kg (750 lb)

== Gallery ==
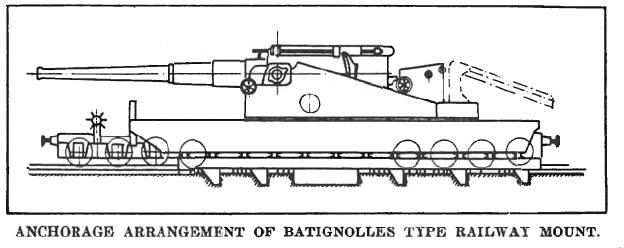
A diagram showing the anchoring system of the Batignolles railway mount.

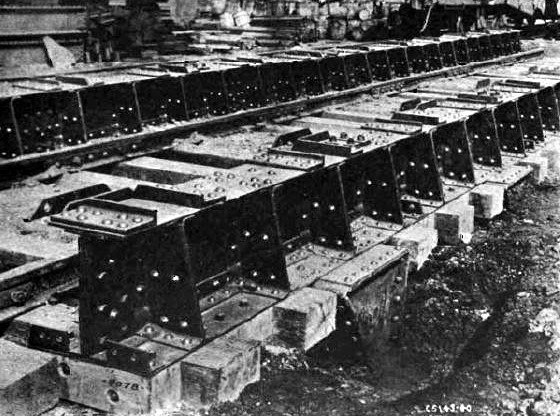
Details of the anchoring for the Batignolles mount.

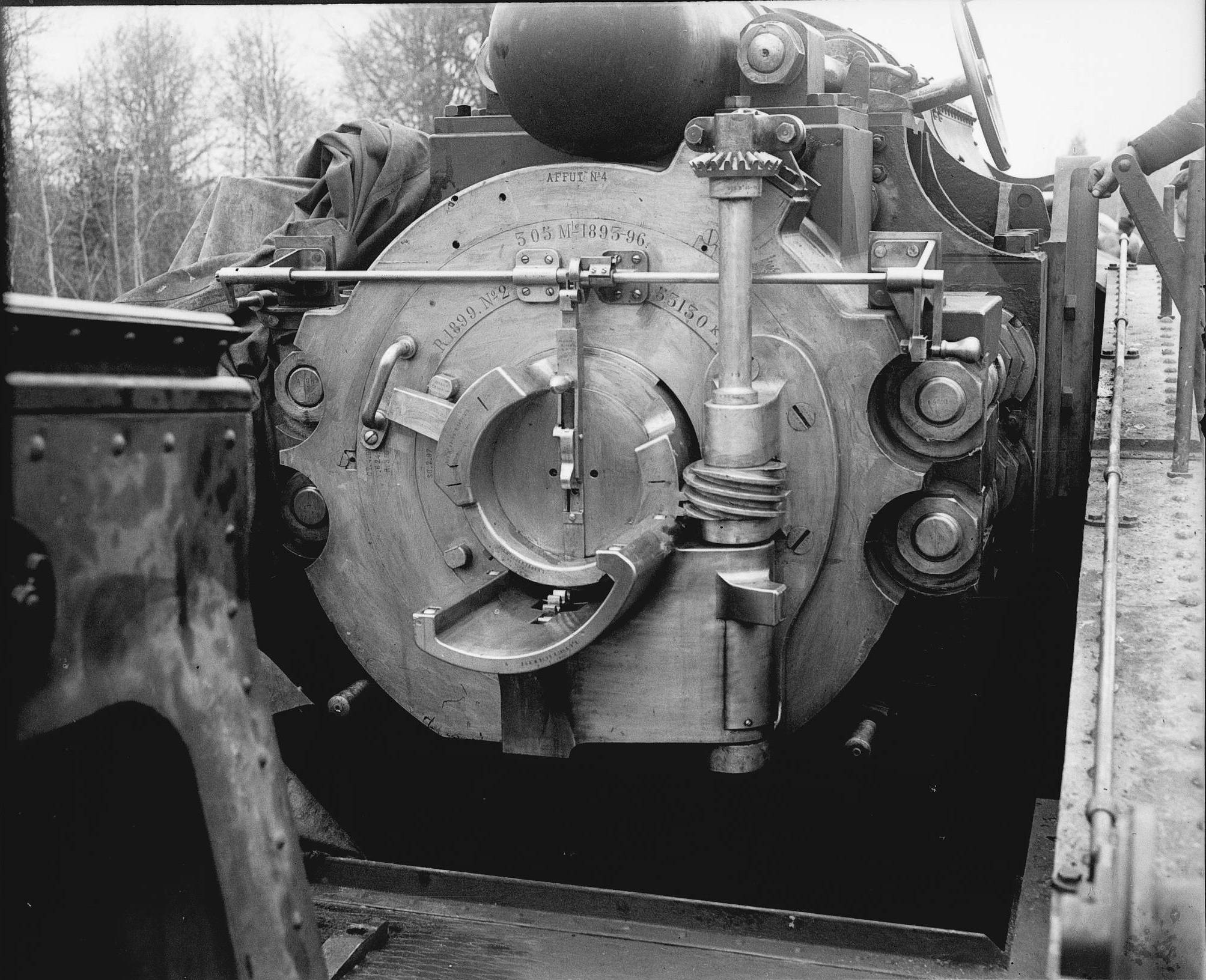
The breech of a 1893/96 gun.

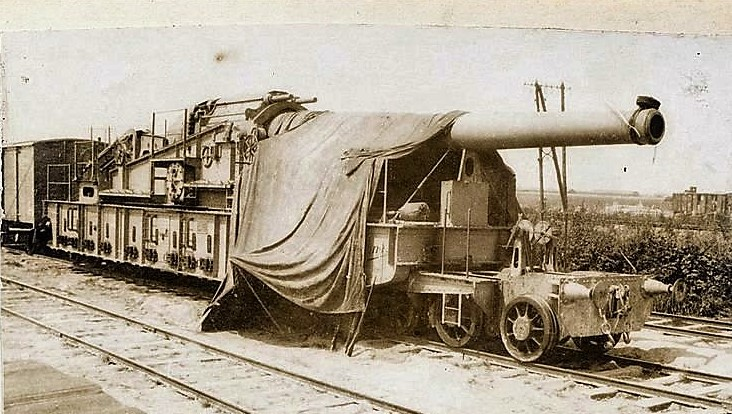
A gun being moved into position during the Battle of the Somme.

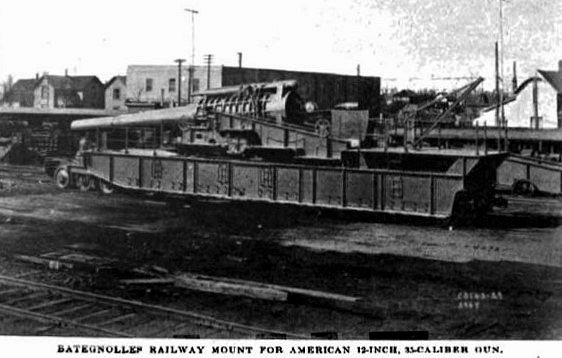
A US Army 12-inch M1895 railway gun which used a similar Batignolles style rail chassis.
