= Canon de 305 mm Modèle 1893/96 gun =

Canon de 305 mm Modèle 1893/96
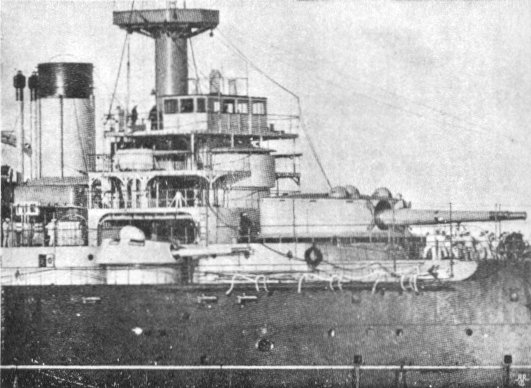
- Forward turret on Suffren
- Type: Naval gun
- Place of origin: France

Service history
- Used by: France
- Wars: First World War

Specifications
- Mass: 48 tonnes (47 long tons; 53 short tons)
- Barrel length: about 12.2 metres (40 ft)
- Shell: Separate-loading, bagged charge
- Shell weight: 349 kilograms (769 lb)
- Caliber: 305 millimetres (12 in)
- Breech: Welin interrupted-screw breech
- Recoil: Hydro-pneumatic
- Elevation: -5°? to +15°
- Traverse: depended on mount
- Rate of fire: 1 rpm
- Muzzle velocity: 780 m/s (2,600 ft/s)
- Maximum firing range: 12,000 m (13,000 yd)

The Canon de 305 mm Modèle 1893/96 was a heavy naval gun used as the main armament of a number of French pre-dreadnoughts during World War I. It equipped the Charlemagne, République and Liberté-class battleships as well as the unique battleships Iéna and Suffren. It was also used as railway artillery in World War I.

== Description ==
The 12-inch/40 calibre Canon de 305 mm Modèle 1893/96 gun was a typical built-up French heavy gun of its period. It used a Welin interrupted-screw breech and bagged propellant with a de Bange obturator to get a good gas seal during firing. It was mounted in twin-gun turrets which had a couple of unusual features. First, most of the turret's operating machinery was housed inside the turret, with only an armored tube to protect the ammunition hoists. This made little difference in the overall weight of the turret, but did raise the machinery higher in the ship than the turrets of other nations, which did have implications for stability. Secondly, they used a hydraulic pivot to lift the turret when it rotated; this was lowered onto a seating ring when the turret was in the proper position to fire. Each turret had a nominal 300° of traverse, although each ship had its own specific limitations.

== Related Guns ==
The 12-inch/40 calibre Canon de 305mm/40 Modèle 1893 gun was an earlier version of this design, mounted in single gun turrets in Masséna.

The 12-inch/45 calibre Canon de 305mm/45 Modèle 1893 gun was an experimental longer barrel version of this design, mounted in single gun turrets in Jauréguiberry and Bouvet.

== World War I railway gun ==
During World War I surplus Modèle 1893/1896 guns were mounted on both rotating centre-pintle, cradle recoil, and sliding-carriage mountings on railway carriages to provide mobile firepower on the Western Front. They fired shells weighing from 321–351 kilograms (708–774 lb) to a maximum range of 31,130 metres (34,040 yd). The railroad mounts had a maximum elevation of 40° which accounts for the extra range over the naval guns.

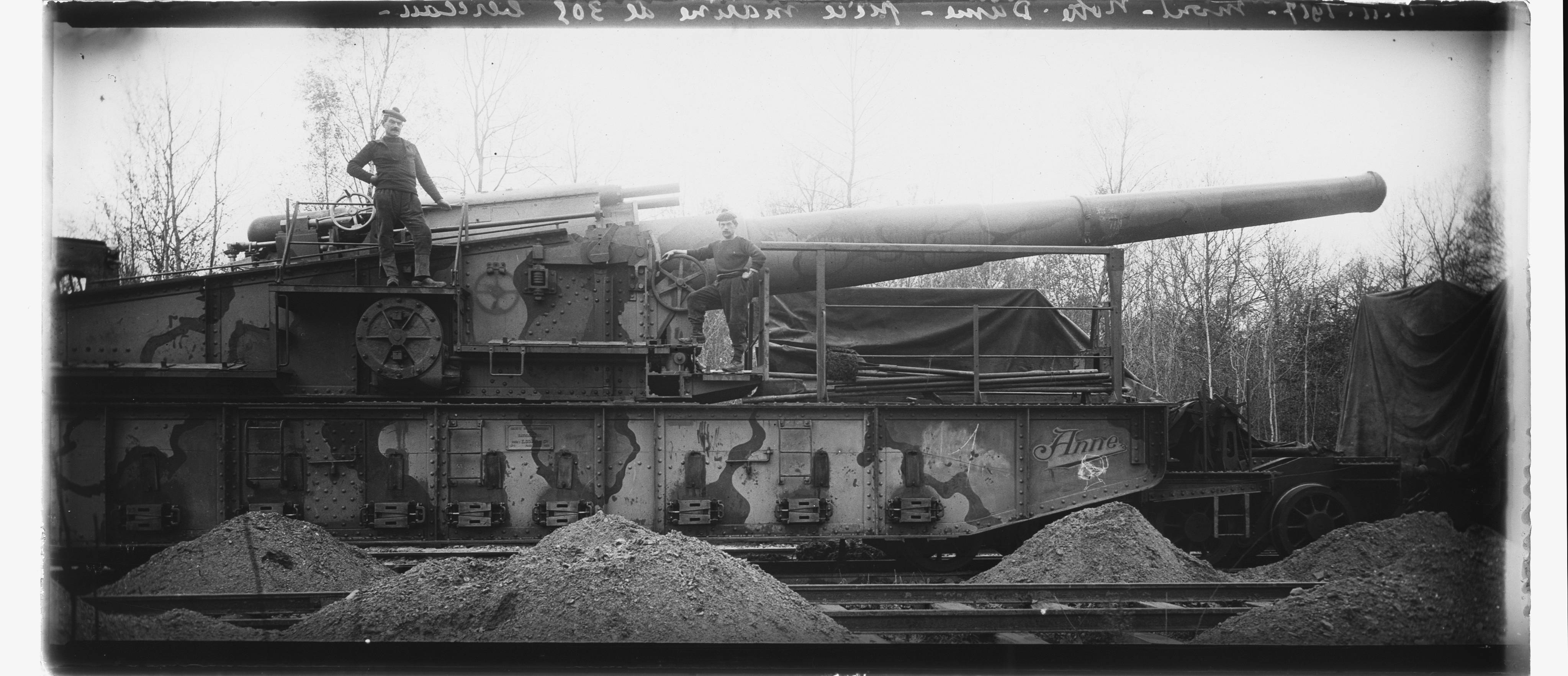
A Canon de 305 modèle 1893/96 à berceau railway gun c. 1917.

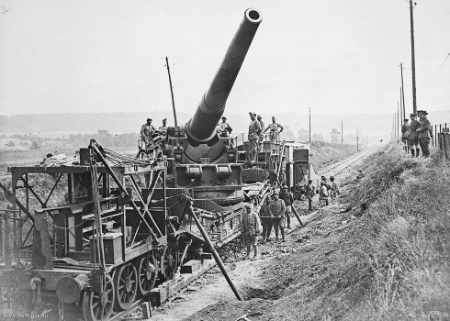
A Canon de 305 modèle 93/96 TAZ railway gun c. 1917.

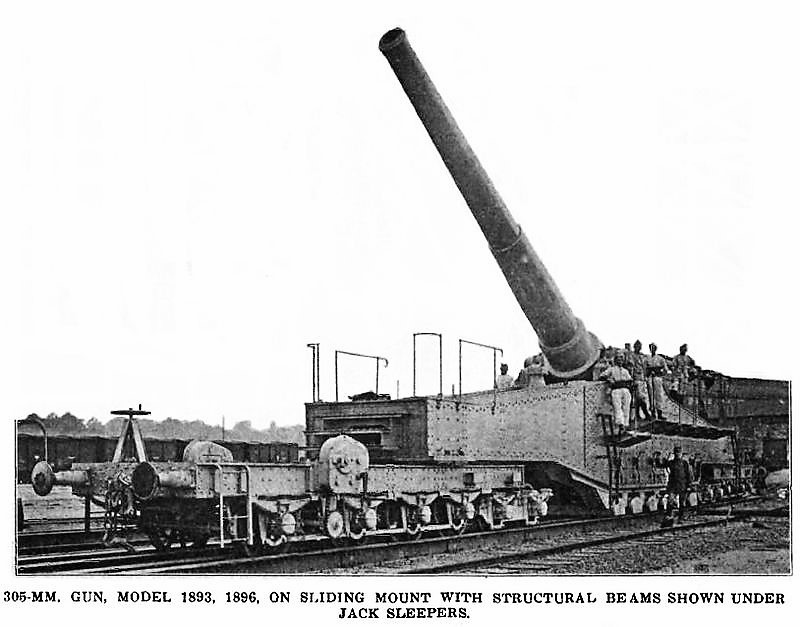
A Canon de 305 modèle 1893/96 à glissement railway gun c. 1918.

== Ammunition ==
- APC (Armor Piercing Capped) - 340 kg (750 lb)
- CI (Cast iron) - 292 kg (644 lb)
- SAPC (Semi-Armor Piercing Capped) - 340 kg (750 lb)

== See also ==
=== Weapons of comparable role, performance and era ===
- Armstrong Whitworth 12 inch /40 naval gun British equivalent naval gun
- BL 12-inch railway gun British equivalent railway gun
- Russian 12 inch 40 caliber naval gun Russian equivalent naval gun
