= Welin breech block =

Cannon breech

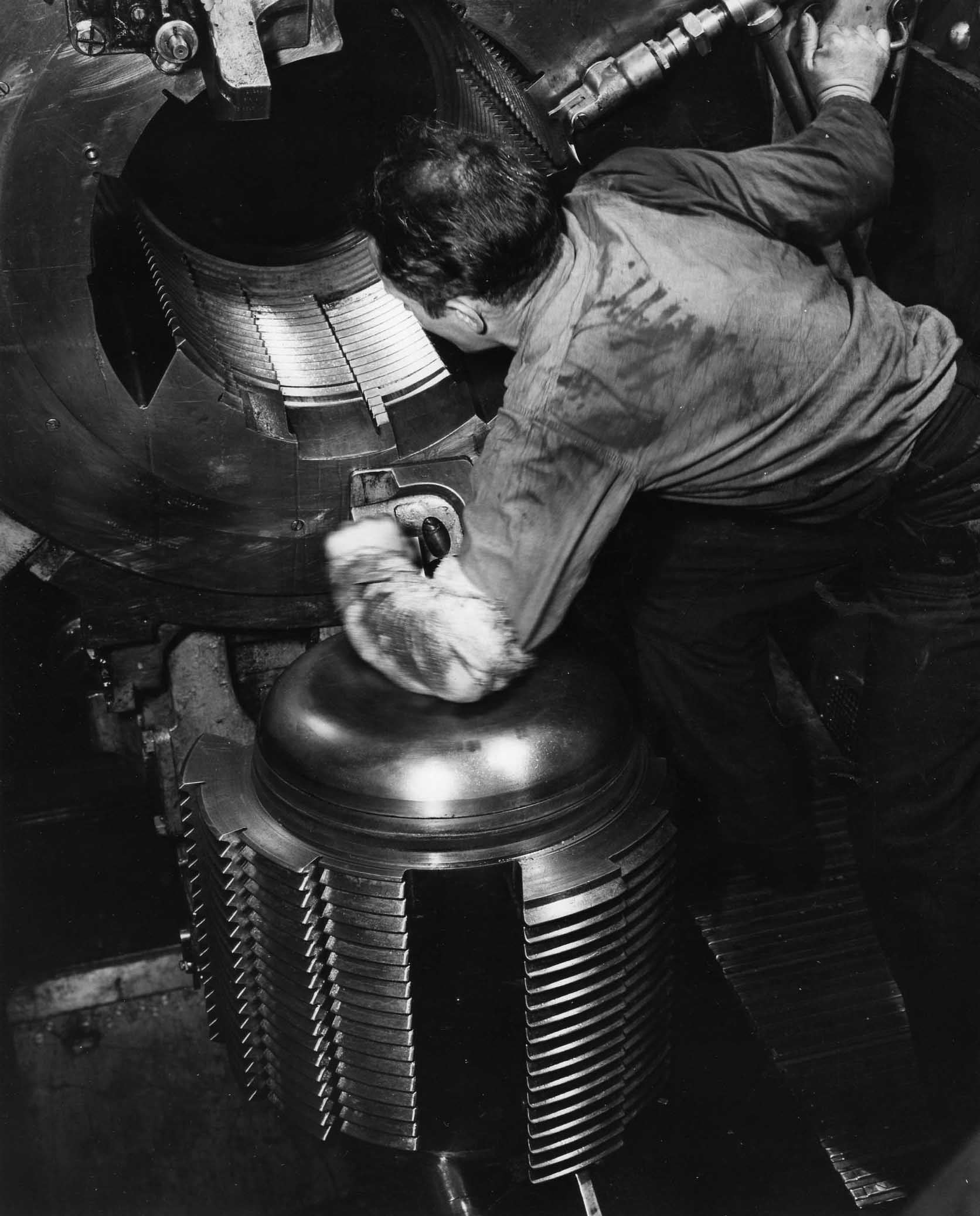
Welin breech-block of a 16-inch Mk 6 gun on USS Alabama (BB-60), 1943. Note the four separate thread "steps" on the block which engage with matching steps in the breech when the block is swung up and inwards and rotated slightly clockwise

The Welin breech block was a revolutionary stepped, interrupted thread design for locking artillery breeches, invented by Swedish engineer Axel Welin in 1889 or 1890. Shortly after, Vickers acquired the British patents. Welin breech blocks provide obturation using the principle of the de Bange obturator for artillery pieces which use separate loading bagged charges and projectiles. In this system the projectile is loaded first and then followed by cloth bags of propellant.

== Design ==
The breech block screw incorporates multiple threaded "steps" of progressively larger radius and a gap step occupying each circular section. A three step breech block screw's circular area would nominally be divided into quarters, with each quarter containing three threaded sections of progressively increasing height and a gap step for insertion.

Each step engages with its matching thread cut in the gun breech when inserted and rotated. A gap in the thread steps is still necessary for the insertion of the largest step before rotation, so the area of the breech secured by threads in the block is:

$$\frac{\text{number of steps} }{1 + \text{number of steps}} \times \text{length of the screw}$$

This design represented a major improvement on previous, non-stepped designs such as the de Bange system. The breech loader [of the] de Bange system uses a single thread step and can engage only half of the block's circumferential threads with the breech, necessitating a long screw to achieve a strong lock. Efficiency is gained with multiple thread step heights on an interrupted screw because the smaller thread steps may be inserted into the breech along the radial vector of any larger step, whereas a single thread step interrupted screw cannot be inserted where any threads of the breech lie in the radial vector as any threads of the screw. Thread lock area is directly related to the munitions strength that may be safely fired, and thus large munitions with single step screw breeches needed unreasonably long breech screws. These in turn required more time and much greater room to extract and move aside to gain access to the gun's chamber to clean and reload it. The engagement of threads around much more of the circumference of the Welin block allowed it to be shorter for the same total engagement area and strength, which in combination with the requirement of less than 90 degree rotation to lock the threads made operation faster than previous designs and possible in much tighter space. The design was also simpler and more secure.

The Welin breech became very common on British and American large calibre naval artillery and also field artillery above about 4.5 inches (114 mm).

Though the US Navy was offered the design a year or two after its invention, it declined, and the American Bethlehem Steel company spent the next five years trying to circumvent Welin's patent before having to buy it through Vickers.

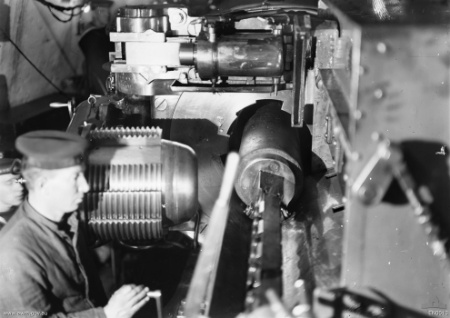
Leftward-opening breech of British 12-inch gun on HMAS Australia, 1918. This breech was locked by rotating counter-clockwise

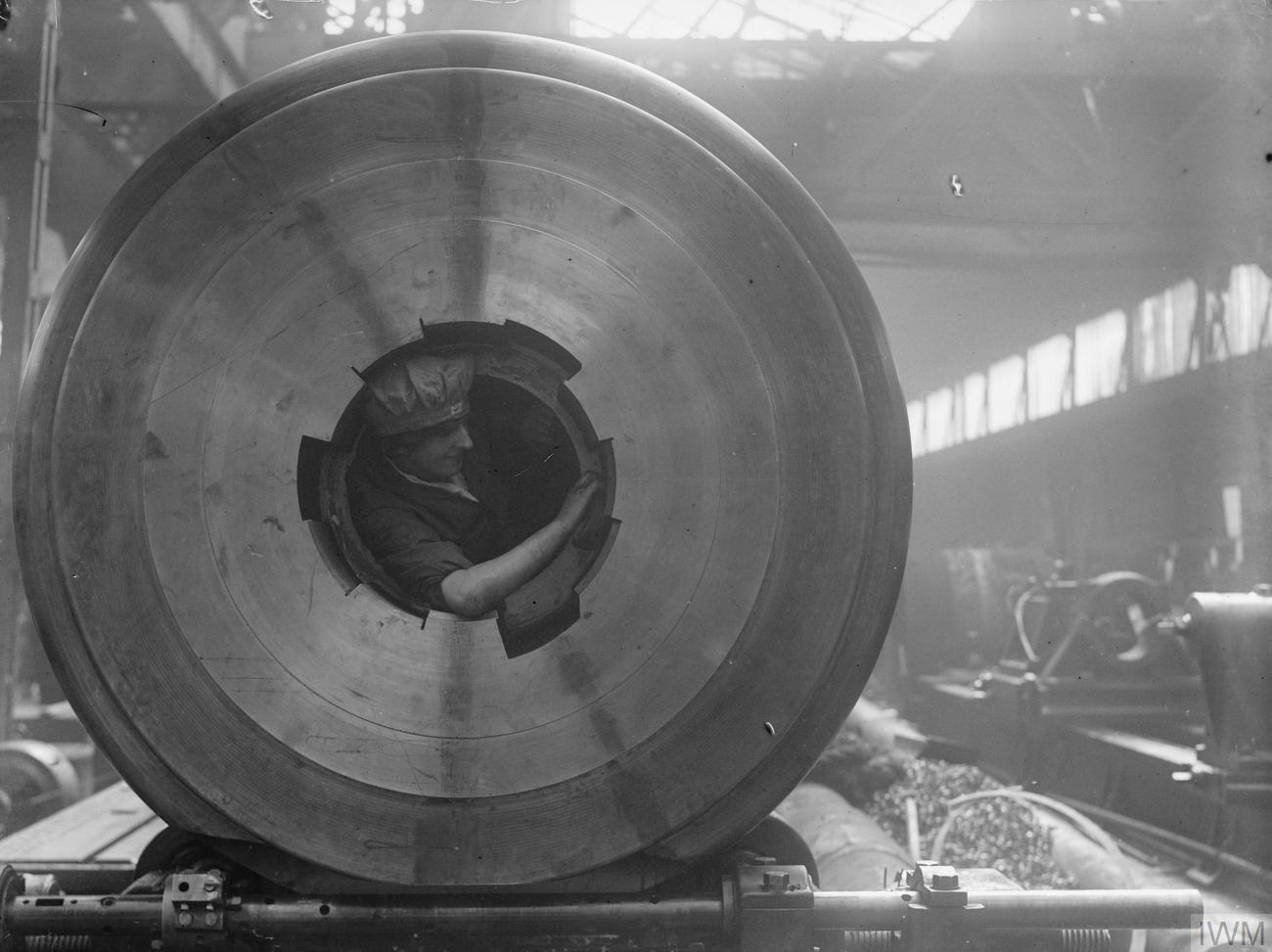
A female worker cleans the breech threads of a 15-inch gun from inside the barrel in the Coventry Ordnance Works during WWI

== See also ==
- Rifled breech loader
