= French battleship Démocratie =

French Liberté-class battleship

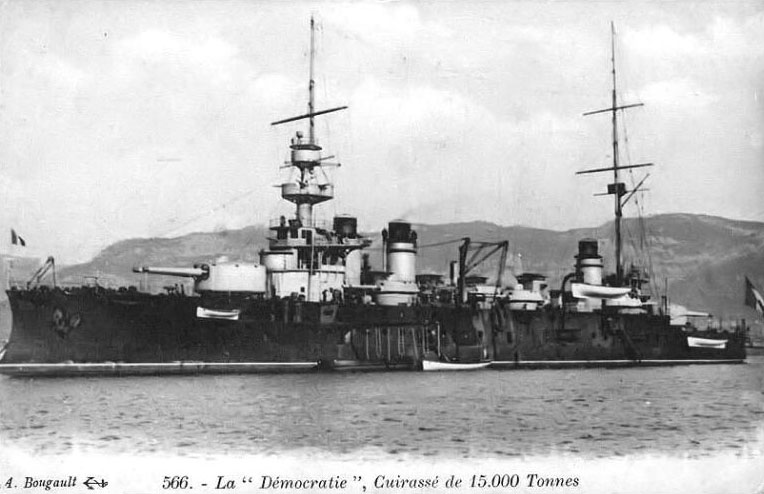
- Démocratie

History

France
- Name: Démocratie
- Namesake: Democracy
- Laid down: 1 May 1903
- Launched: 30 April 1904
- Commissioned: January 1908
- Decommissioned: 1 April 1920
- Stricken: 1921
- Fate: Broken up for scrap

General characteristics
- Class & type: Liberté-class battleship
- Displacement: Full load: 14,900 t (14,700 long tons)
- Length: 135.25 m (443 ft 9 in) loa
- Beam: 24.25 m (79 ft 7 in)
- Draft: 8.2 m (26 ft 11 in)
- Installed power: 22 × Belleville boilers; 17,500 CV (17,300 ihp)
- Propulsion: 3 × screw propellers; 3 × triple-expansion steam engines
- Speed: 18 knots (33 km/h; 21 mph)
- Range: 8,400 nautical miles (15,600 km; 9,700 mi) at 10 kn (19 km/h; 12 mph)
- Complement: 32 officers; 710 enlisted men
- Armament: 4 × 305 mm (12 in) guns; 10 × 194 mm (7.6 in) guns; 13 × 65 mm (2.6 in) guns; 10 × 47 mm (1.9 in) guns; 2 × 450 mm (17.7 in) torpedo tubes
- Armor: Belt: 180 to 280 mm (7.1 to 11.0 in); Turrets: 360 mm (14 in); Conning tower: 266 mm (10.5 in); Upper deck: 54 mm (2.1 in); Lower deck: 51 mm (2 in)

Démocratie was a pre-dreadnought battleship built for the French Navy in the mid-1900s. She was the fourth member of the Liberté class, which included three other vessels and was a derivative of the preceding République class, with the primary difference being the inclusion of a heavier secondary battery. Démocratie carried a main battery of four 305 mm (12 in) guns, like the République, but mounted ten 194 mm (7.6 in) guns for her secondary armament in place of the 164 mm (6.5 in) guns of the earlier vessels. Like many late pre-dreadnought designs, Démocratie was completed after the revolutionary British battleship HMS Dreadnought had entered service, rendering her obsolescent.

On entering service, Démocratie joined the Mediterranean Squadron, based in Toulon. She immediately began the normal peacetime training routine of squadron and fleet maneuvers and cruises to various ports in the Mediterranean. She also participated in several naval reviews for a number of French and foreign dignitaries. Following the outbreak of war in July 1914, Démocratie was used to escort troopship convoys carrying elements of the French Army from French North Africa to face the Germans invading northern France. She thereafter steamed to contain the Austro-Hungarian Navy in the Adriatic Sea, taking part in the minor Battle of Antivari in August. The increasing threat of Austro-Hungarian U-boats and the unwillingness of the Austro-Hungarian fleet to engage in battle led to a period of monotonous patrols that ended with Italy's entry into the war on the side of France, which allowed the French fleet to be withdrawn.

In mid-1916, she became involved in events in Greece, being stationed in Salonika to put pressure on the Greek government to enter the war on the side of the Allies, but she saw little action for the final two years of the war. Immediately after the end of the war, she was sent to the Black Sea, first to oversee the surrender of German-occupied Russian warships there, and then as part of the Allied intervention in the Russian Civil War. In May 1919, she carried the Ottoman delegation to France to sign the Treaty of Sèvres. The ship was placed in reserve in 1920, stricken from the naval register in 1921, and broken up later that year.

== Design ==
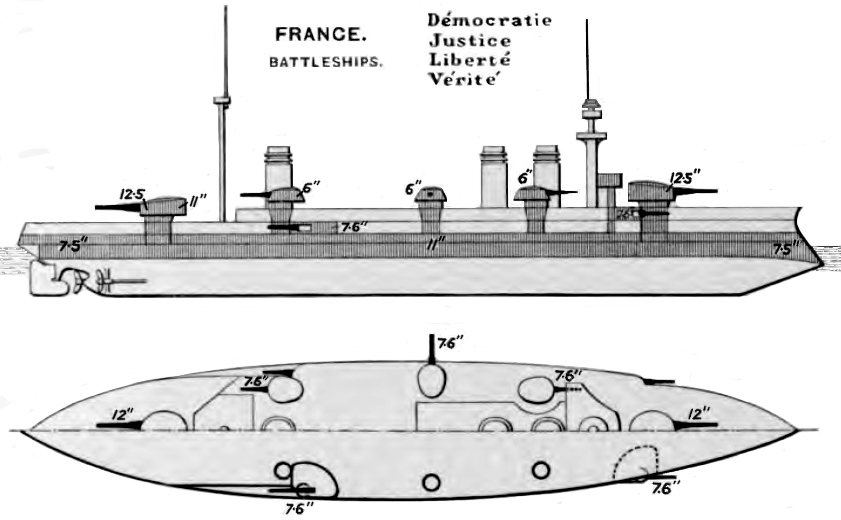
Line-drawing of the Liberté class

The Liberté-class battleships were originally intended to be part of the République-class battleship, which was to total six ships. After work on the first two ships had begun, the British began construction of the King Edward VII-class battleships. These ships carried a heavy secondary battery of 9.2-inch (230 mm) guns, which prompted the French Naval General Staff to request that the last four Républiques be redesigned to include a heavier secondary battery in response. Ironically, the designer, Louis-Émile Bertin, had proposed such an armament for the République class, but the General Staff had rejected it since the larger guns had a lower rate of fire than the smaller 164 mm (6.5 in) guns that had been selected for the République design. Because the ships were broadly similar apart from their armament, the Libertés are sometimes considered to be a sub-class of the République type.

Démocratie was 135.25 meters (443 ft 9 in) long overall and had a beam of 24.25 m (79 ft 7 in) and an average draft of 8.2 m (26 ft 11 in). She displaced up to 14,900 metric tons (14,700 long tons) at full load. The battleship was powered by three vertical triple-expansion steam engines, each driving one propeller shaft using steam provided by twenty-two Belleville boilers. They were rated at 17,500 metric horsepower (17,300 ihp) and provided a top speed of 18 knots (33 km/h; 21 mph). Coal storage amounted to 1,800 t (1,800 long tons; 2,000 short tons), which provided a maximum range of 8,400 nautical miles (15,600 km; 9,700 mi) at a cruising speed of 10 knots (19 km/h; 12 mph). She had a crew of 32 officers and 710 enlisted men.

Démocratie's main battery consisted of four 305 mm (12 in) Modèle 1893/96 guns mounted in two twin-gun turrets, one forward and one aft of the superstructure. The secondary battery consisted of ten 194 mm (7.6 in) Modèle 1902 guns; six were mounted in single turrets, and four in casemates in the hull. She also carried thirteen 65 mm (2.6 in) Modèle 1902 guns and ten 47 mm (1.9 in) Modèle 1902 guns for defense against torpedo boats. The ship was also armed with two 450 mm (17.7 in) torpedo tubes, which were submerged in the hull on the broadside.

The ship's main belt was 280 mm (11 in) thick in the central citadel, and was connected to two armored decks; the upper deck was 54 mm (2.1 in) thick while the lower deck was 51 mm (2 in) thick, with 70 mm (2.8 in) sloped sides. The main battery guns were protected by up to 360 mm (14.2 in) of armor on the fronts of the turrets, while the secondary turrets had 156 mm (6.1 in) of armor on the faces. The casemates were protected with 174 mm (6.9 in) of steel plate. The conning tower had 266 mm (10.5 in) thick sides.

=== Modifications ===
Over the course of 1912 through 1914, the navy tried to modify Démocratie and her sister Vérité to allow the 305 mm guns to be aimed continuously. Tests to determine whether the main battery turrets could be modified to increase the elevation of the guns (and hence their range) proved to be impossible, but the Navy determined that tanks on either side of the vessel could be flooded to induce a heel of 2 degrees. This increased the maximum range of the guns from 12,500 to 13,500 m (13,700 to 14,800 yd). New motors were installed in the secondary turrets in 1915–1916 to improve their training and elevation rates. Also in 1915, the 47 mm guns located on either side of the bridge were removed and the two on the aft superstructure were moved to the roof of the rear turret. On 8 December 1915, the naval command issued orders that the light battery was to be revised to eight of the 47 mm guns and ten 65 mm (2.6 in) guns. The light battery was revised again in 1916, with four 47 mm guns being converted with high-angle anti-aircraft mounts. They were placed atop the rear main battery turret and the number 7 and 8 secondary turret roofs. In 1912–1913, the ship received two 2 m (6 ft 7 in) Barr & Stroud rangefinders.

== Service history ==
=== Construction – 1911 ===
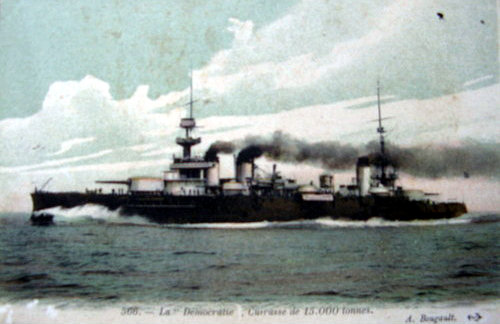
Colorized photo of Démocratie

Démocratie was laid down at the Arsenal de Brest shipyard on 1 May 1903, launched on 30 April 1904, and completed on 9 January 1908, over a year after the revolutionary British battleship HMS Dreadnought entered service, which rendered the pre-dreadnoughts like Démocratie outdated before they were completed. Following her completion, she left Brest on 20 January and steamed south to Toulon, where she joined the 1st Division of the 1st Battle Squadron on 10 March, which included the battleships Patrie and République. In June and July, the Mediterranean and Northern Squadrons conducted their annual maneuvers, this time off Bizerte. In October, the 1st Division ships steamed to Barcelona, Spain, but Démocratie did not join her division mates, since the French government feared her name would be provocative to the Spanish King Alfonso XIII.

In early 1909, the fleet went to Villefranche-sur-Mer, where the ships were inspected by Albert I, Prince of Monaco during his visit to the port from 18 to 24 February. After his departure, the Mediterranean Squadron conducted training exercises off Corsica, followed by a naval review in Villefranche for President Armand Fallières on 26 April. Démocratie, Patrie, Liberté, and the armored cruiser Ernest Renan steamed into the Atlantic for training exercises on 2 June; while at sea ten days later, they rendezvoused with République, Justice, and the protected cruiser Galilée at Cádiz, Spain. Training included serving as targets for the fleet's submarines in the Pertuis d'Antioche strait. The ships then steamed north to La Pallice, where they conducted tests with their wireless telegraphy sets and shooting training in Quiberon Bay. From 8 to 15 July, the ships lay at Brest and the next day, they steamed to Le Havre. There, they met the Northern Squadron for another fleet review for Fallières on 17 July. Ten days later, the combined fleet steamed to Cherbourg, where they held another fleet review, this time during the visit of Czar Nicholas II of Russia. Démocratie, République, and Patrie departed for Toulon on 17 August and arrived on 6 September.

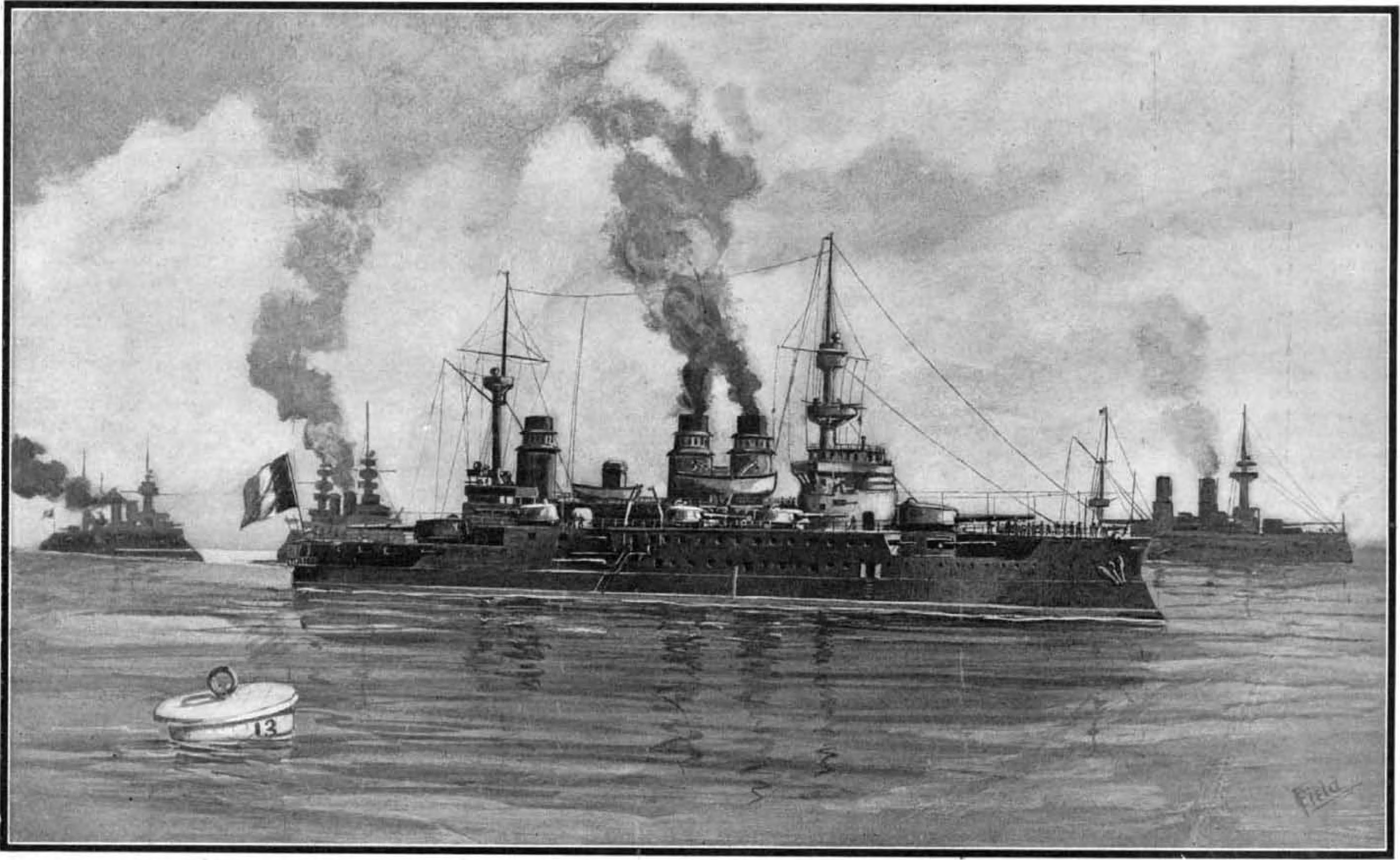
Illustration of Démocratie

Démocratie joined Patrie, Justice, Vérité, République, and Suffren for a simulated attack on the port of Nice on 18 February. The ships of the 1st Squadron held training exercises off Sardinia and Algeria from 21 May to 4 June, followed by combined maneuvers with the 2nd Squadron from 7 to 18 June. An outbreak of typhoid among the crews of the battleships in early December forced the navy to confine them to Golfe-Juan to contain the fever. By 15 December, the outbreak had subsided. On 16 April 1911, Démocratie and the rest of the fleet escorted Vérité, which had aboard Fallières, the Naval Minister Théophile Delcassé, and Charles Dumont, the Minister of Public Works, Posts and Telegraphs, to Bizerte. They arrived two days later and held a fleet review that included two British battleships, two Italian battleships, and a Spanish cruiser on 19 April. The fleet returned to Toulon on 29 April, where Fallières doubled the crews' rations and suspended any punishments to thank the men for their performance. Démocratie and the rest of 1st Squadron and the armored cruisers Ernest Renan and Léon Gambetta went on a cruise in the western Mediterranean in May and June, visiting a number of ports including Cagliari, Bizerte, Bône, Philippeville, Algiers, and Bougie.

By 1 August, the battleships of the Danton class had begun to enter service, and they were assigned to the 1st Squadron, displacing six Liberté and République-class ships to the 2nd Squadron. The fleet held another fleet review outside Toulon on 4 September. Admiral Jauréguiberry took the fleet to sea on 11 September for maneuvers and visits to Golfe-Juan and Marseille, returning to port five days later. On 25 September, Liberté exploded while in Toulon, another French battleship claimed by unstable Poudre B propellant. Several ships in the harbor were damaged, and Démocratie lost three men who were killed by flying debris. Despite the accident, the fleet continued with its normal routine of training exercises and cruises for the rest of the year. These included cruises to Les Salins, Le Lavandou, and Porquerolles until the training program ended on 15 December.

=== 1912–1914 ===
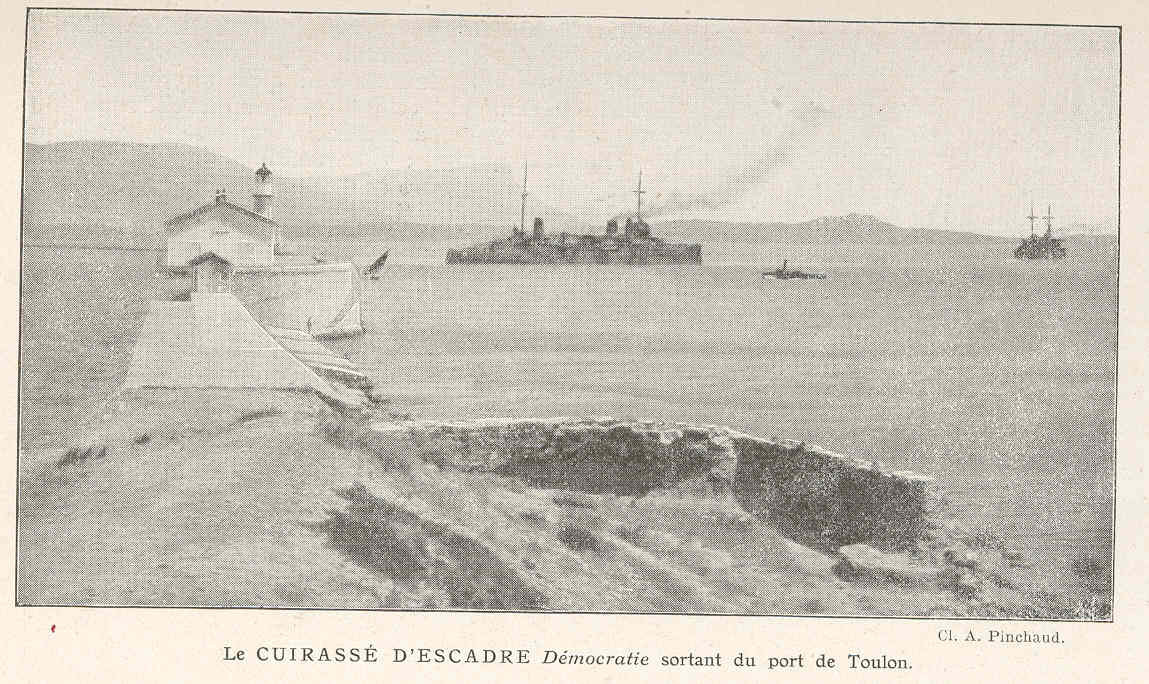
Démocratie steaming out of Toulon, c. 1913

Delcassé visited Démocratie in April 1912, after which she went to sea with her four other ships of the 2nd Squadron for training exercises. Admiral Augustin Boué de Lapeyrère inspected both battleship squadrons in Golfe-Juan from 2 to 12 July, after which the ships cruised first to Corsica and then to Algeria. The ship saw little further activity for the rest of the year, and on 2 October the ship joined Patrie, République, and Suffren in Bizerte. The ships went to Golfe-Juan on 18 October. The ships then took part in training exercises off Le Lavandou in early January 1914. The French fleet, which by then included sixteen battleships, held large-scale maneuvers between Toulon and Sardinia beginning on 19 May. The exercises concluded with a fleet review for President Raymond Poincaré. Gunnery practice followed from 1 to 4 July. The 2nd Squadron departed Toulon on 23 August with the armored cruisers Jules Ferry and Edgar Quinet and two destroyer flotillas to conduct training exercises in the Atlantic. While en route to Brest, the ships stopped in Tangier, Royan, Le Verdon, La Pallice, Quiberon Bay, and Cherbourg. They reached Brest on 20 September, where they met a Russian squadron of four battleships and five cruisers. The ships then steamed back south, stopping in Cádiz, Tangier, Mers El Kébir, Algiers, and Bizerte before ultimately arriving back in Toulon on 1 November. On 3 December, Démocratie, Justice, Vérité, and République conducted torpedo training and range-finding drills.

The 2nd Squadron ships conducted torpedo training on 19 January 1914, and later that month they steamed to Bizerte, returning to Toulon on 6 February. On 4 March, République, Démocratie, Vérité, and Justice joined the 1st Squadron battleships and the 2nd Light Squadron for a visit to Porto-Vecchio, Sardinia. On 30 March, the 2nd Squadron ships steamed to Malta to visit the British Mediterranean Fleet, remaining there until 3 April. During a fleet exercise on 28 May 1914, Démocratie collided with the battleship Suffren when the latter vessel lost power. Suffren was only lightly damaged, with her port anchor and hawsepipe carried away, though Démocratie suffered little damage and was able to continue with the rest of the fleet. The squadron visited various ports in June, but following the assassination of Archduke Franz Ferdinand and the ensuing July Crisis prompted the fleet to remain close to port, making only short training sorties as international tensions rose.

=== World War I ===
==== 1914–1915 ====
Following the outbreak of World War I in July 1914, France announced general mobilization on 1 August. The next day, Boué de Lapeyrère ordered the entire French fleet to begin raising steam at 22:15 so the ships could sortie early the next day. Faced with the prospect that the German Mediterranean Division—centered on the battlecruiser Goeben—might attack the troopships carrying the French Army in North Africa to metropolitan France, the French fleet was tasked with providing heavy escort to the convoys. Accordingly, Démocratie and the rest of the 2nd Squadron were sent to Algiers, where they joined a group of seven passenger ships that had a contingent of 7,000 troops from XIX Corps aboard. While at sea, the new dreadnought battleships Courbet and Jean Bart and the Danton-class battleships Condorcet and Vergniaud, which took over as the convoy's escort. Instead of attacking the convoys, Goeben bombarded Bône and Philippeville and then fled east to the Ottoman Empire.

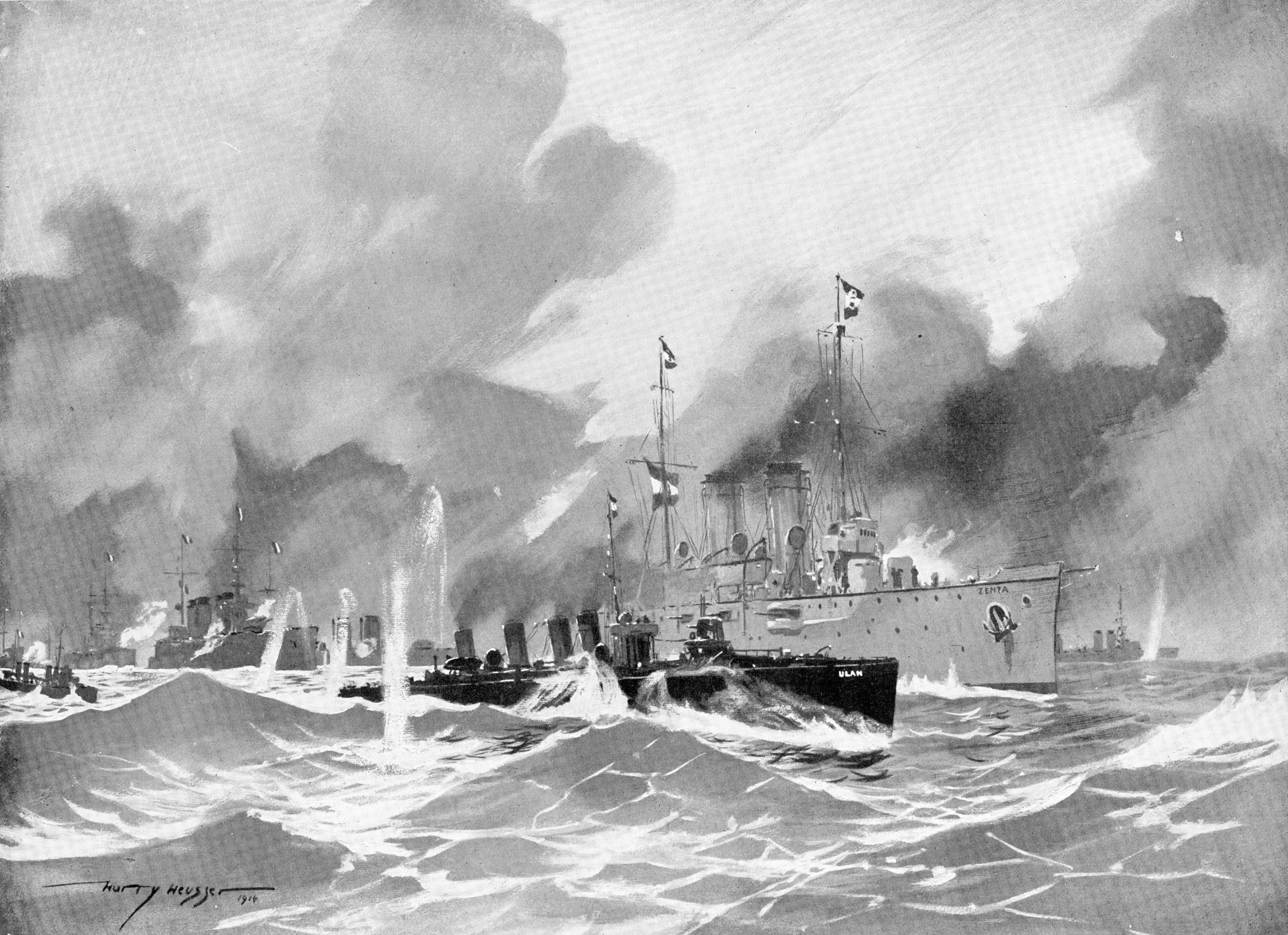
The Austro-Hungarian Zenta and Ulan under fire from the French fleet at the Battle of Antivari

On 12 August, France and Britain declared war on the Austro-Hungarian Empire as the war continued to widen. The 1st and 2nd Squadrons were therefore sent to the southern Adriatic Sea to contain the Austro-Hungarian Navy. On 15 August, the two squadrons arrived off the Strait of Otranto, where they met the patrolling British cruisers HMS Defence and HMS Weymouth north of Othonoi. Boué de Lapeyrère then took the fleet into the Adriatic in an attempt to force a battle with the Austro-Hungarian fleet; the following morning, the British and French cruisers spotted vessels in the distance that, on closing with them, turned out to be the protected cruiser SMS Zenta and the torpedo boat Ulan, which were trying to blockade the coast of Montenegro. In the ensuing Battle of Antivari, Boué de Lapeyrère initially ordered his battleships to fire warning shots, but this caused confusion among the fleet's gunners that allowed Ulan to escape. The slower Zenta attempted to evade, but she quickly received several hits that disabled her engines and set her on fire. She sank shortly thereafter and the Anglo-French fleet withdrew.

The French fleet patrolled the southern end of the Adriatic for the next three days with the expectation that the Austro-Hungarians would counterattack, but their opponent never arrived. On 17 August, Justice and Démocratie collided in heavy fog at 09:20; the latter vessel lost her rudder and center screw. République took her under tow at 12:40, steaming first to Corfu and then to Malta. They arrived there on 20 August, where repairs were completed, though she returned to the fleet without her center screw. On 18–19 September, the fleet made another incursion into the Adriatic, steaming as far north as the island of Lissa; on the return south, several French cruisers inadvertently came within range of the guns at Cattaro, so Démocratie and Patrie opened fire at the guns to suppress them while the cruisers withdrew. On 25 September, the ship was detached to Toulon, where her center propeller was replaced.

The fleet continued these operations in October and November, including a sweep off the coast of Montenegro to cover a group of merchant vessels replenishing their coal there. Throughout this period, the battleships rotated through Malta or Toulon for periodic maintenance; Corfu became the primary naval base in the area. The patrols continued through late December, when an Austro-Hungarian U-boat torpedoed Jean Bart, leading to the decision by the French naval command to withdraw the main battle fleet from direct operations in the Adriatic. For the rest of the month, the fleet remained at Navarino Bay. The battle fleet thereafter occupied itself with patrols between Kythira and Crete; these sweeps continued until 7 May. Following the Italian entry into the war on the side of France, the French fleet handed control of the Adriatic operations to the Italian Regia Marina (Royal Navy) and withdrew its fleet to Malta and Bizerte, the latter becoming the main fleet base.

==== 1916–1918 ====
Démocratie and Justice were detached from the main fleet in January 1916 to reinforce the Dardanelles Division, though the Allies evacuated their forces fighting there that month. Démocratie left on 11 April for repairs in Toulon and collided with the Russian steamer SS Odessa off Cape Maleas, though she was not significantly damaged. In June, the French battle fleet was reorganized; Démocratie, her two sisters, the two République-class ships, and Suffren were assigned to the 3rd Squadron. The ships were tasked with pressuring the Greek government, which to that point had remained neutral, since King Constantine I's wife Sophie was the sister of the German Kaiser Wilhelm II. The French and British were growing increasingly frustrated by Constantine's refusal to enter the war, and sent the 3rd Squadron to try to influence events in the country. Over the course of June and July, the ships alternated between Salonika and Mudros, and the squadron was transferred to Corfu on 12 August, where it joined the rest of the French fleet. Early on 27 August, the 3rd Squadron sailed to Milos, and on 1 September went to sea again, headed to Keratsini. From there, Démocratie, Patrie, and Suffren steamed to the roadstead off Eleusis just outside Athens on 7 October. The ships were to take part in an attack on the Greek fleet, and Démocratie was to attack the battleship Kilkis. But the plan was shelved and the French ultimately seized the Greek ships on 19 October.

In the meantime, in August, a pro-Allied group launched a coup against the monarchy in the Noemvriana, which the Allies sought to support. Several French ships sent men ashore in Athens on 1 December to support the coup, but they were quickly defeated by the royalist Greek Army. In response, the British and French fleet imposed a blockade of the royalist-controlled parts of the country. By June 1917, Constantine had been forced to abdicate and the 3rd Squadron was disbanded. Démocratie returned to the 2nd Squadron on 1 July, which included the other Liberté-class ships and three of the Danton-class battleships. They remained in Corfu, largely immobilized due to shortages of coal, preventing training until late September 1918. In late October, members of the Central Powers began signing armistices with the British and French, signaling the end of the war. The 2nd Squadron ships were sent to Constantinople to oversee the surrender of Ottoman forces, and Démocratie and Justice proceeded into the Black Sea, where they supervised the transfer of Russian warships that had been seized by the Germans back to Russian control.

=== Postwar career ===
Shortly after the end of the war, Démocratie, Justice, and a destroyer joined an Allied fleet (including the British dreadnoughts HMS Superb and Temeraire and the Italian pre-dreadnought Roma) that was sent to the Black Sea port of Sevastopol. They oversaw the enforcement of the terms of the Armistice with Germany; the Germans had previously seized Russian naval units and stationed occupation forces there under the terms of the Treaty of Brest-Litovsk. The French contingent provided crews for a pair of Russian destroyers and two German U-boats, and the other Allied ships similarly activated Russian and German vessels to secure the area.

On 7 January 1919, the battleship Mirabeau arrived in Sevastopol and relieved Démocratie. The latter vessel then returned to Constantinople where she joined the 2nd Squadron, which at that time also included Justice, the Danton-class ships Diderot and Vergniaud, and the dreadnought France. The French command detached Démocratie to Smyrna to prevent Italy from occupying the area. Démocratie later returned to the Black Sea and in May, was off Odessa in company with Ernest Renan; on 25 May the two ships departed for Constantinople. There, she embarked Grand Vizier Damat Ferid Pasha and carried him to France, where he was given the peace terms according to the Treaty of Sèvres. Démocratie arrived in Toulon on 11 June and saw no further activity until she was placed in reserve on 1 April 1920. The ship was stricken from the naval register on 18 May 1921. The following month she was sold to ship breakers and towed to Savona, Italy, where she was broken up for scrap.
