= French battleship Justice =

French Liberté-class battleship

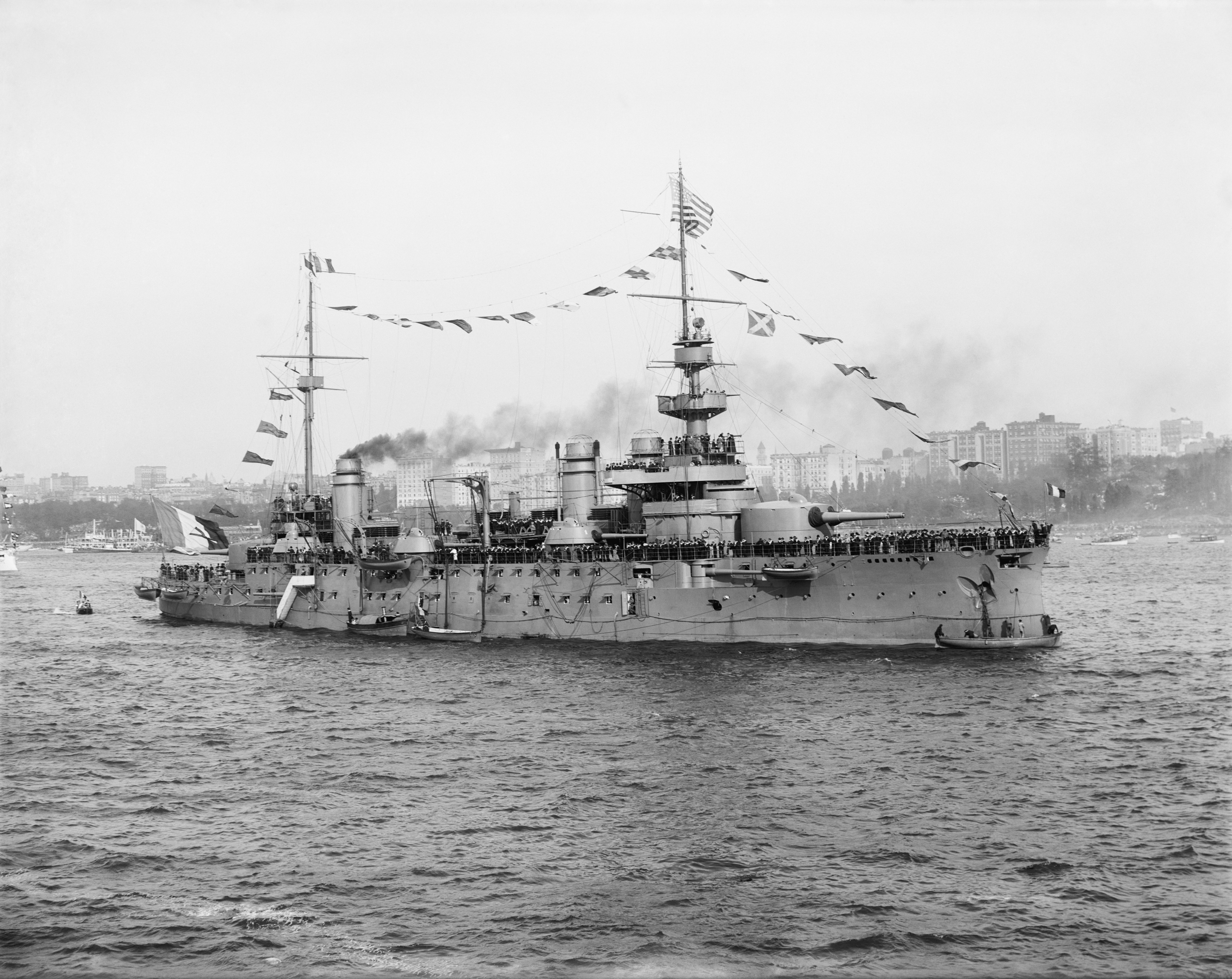
- Justice in the United States in 1909

History

France
- Name: Justice
- Namesake: Justice
- Laid down: 1 April 1903
- Launched: 27 October 1904
- Commissioned: 15 April 1908
- Decommissioned: 1 March 1921
- Fate: Scrapped in 1922

General characteristics
- Class & type: Liberté-class battleship
- Displacement: Full load: 14,900 t (14,700 long tons)
- Length: 135.25 m (443 ft 9 in) loa
- Beam: 24.25 m (79 ft 7 in)
- Draft: 8.2 m (26 ft 11 in)
- Installed power: 24 × Niclausse boilers; 17,500 CV (17,300 ihp)
- Propulsion: 3 × screw propellers; 3 × triple-expansion steam engines
- Speed: 18 knots (33 km/h; 21 mph)
- Range: 8,400 nautical miles (15,600 km; 9,700 mi) at 10 kn (19 km/h; 12 mph)
- Complement: 32 officers; 710 enlisted men
- Armament: 4 × 305 mm (12 in) guns; 10 × 194 mm (7.6 in) guns; 13 × 65 mm (2.6 in) guns; 10 × 47 mm (1.9 in) guns; 2 × 450 mm (17.7 in) torpedo tubes
- Armor: Belt: 180 to 280 mm (7.1 to 11.0 in); Turrets: 360 mm (14 in); Conning tower: 266 mm (10.5 in); Upper deck: 54 mm (2.1 in); Lower deck: 51 mm (2 in)

Justice was a pre-dreadnought battleship built for the French Navy, commissioned in 1908. She was the second member of the Liberté class, which included three other vessels, and was a derivative of the preceding République class, the primary difference being the inclusion of a heavier secondary battery. Justice carried a main battery of four 305 mm (12 in) guns, like the République, but mounted ten 194 mm (7.6 in) guns for her secondary armament in place of the 164 mm (6.5 in) guns of the earlier vessels. Like many late pre-dreadnought designs, Justice was completed after the revolutionary British battleship HMS Dreadnought had entered service, rendering her obsolescent.

On entering service, Justice became the flagship of the 2nd Division of the Mediterranean Squadron, based in Toulon. She immediately began the normal peacetime training routine of squadron and fleet maneuvers and cruises to various ports in the Mediterranean. She also participated in several naval reviews for a number of French and foreign dignitaries. In September 1909, the ships of the 2nd Division crossed the Atlantic to the United States to represent France at the Hudson–Fulton Celebration. She collided with her sister ship Démocratie twice, in December 1913 and August 1914, though she was not badly damaged in either accident.

Following the outbreak of war in July 1914, Justice was used to escort troopship convoys carrying elements of the French Army from French North Africa to face the Germans invading northern France. She thereafter steamed to contain the Austro-Hungarian Navy in the Adriatic Sea, taking part in the minor Battle of Antivari in August. The increasing threat of Austro-Hungarian U-boats and the unwillingness of the Austro-Hungarian fleet to engage in battle led to a period of monotonous patrols that ended with Italy's entry into the war on the side of France, which allowed the French fleet to be withdrawn. In mid-1916, she became involved in events in Greece, being stationed in Salonika to put pressure on the Greek government to enter the war on the side of the Allies, but she saw little action for the final two years of the war.

Immediately after the end of the war, she was sent to the Black Sea, first to oversee the surrender of German-occupied Russian warships there, and then to join the Allied intervention in the Russian Civil War, helping to defend Odessa and Sevastopol from the Bolsheviks. By April 1919, war-weary crews demanded to return to France, leading to quickly suppressed mutinies on Justice and two other battleships. Justice was used to tow the crippled battleship Mirabeau back to France, thereafter becoming a training ship. She served in this capacity only briefly, however, and was placed in reserve in April 1920, decommissioned in March 1921, and sold for scrap in December.

== Design ==
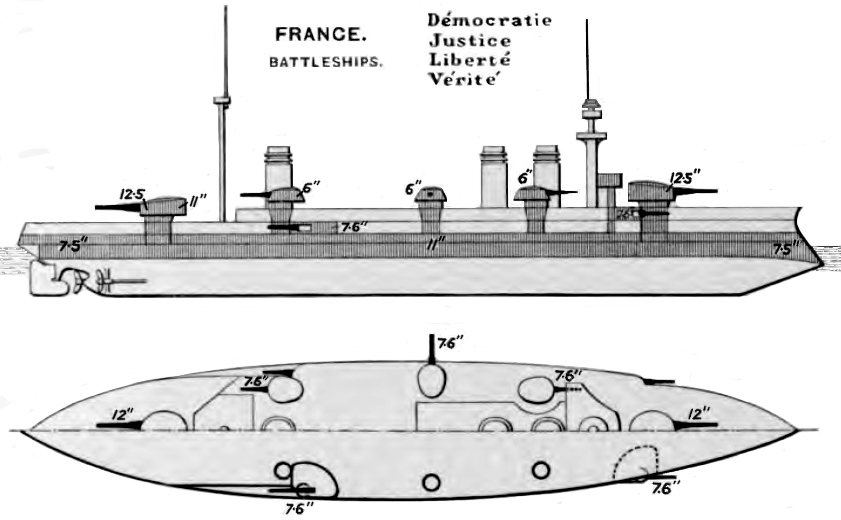
Line-drawing of the Liberté class

The Liberté-class battleships were originally intended to be part of the République-class battleship, which was to total six ships. After work on the first two ships had begun, the British began construction of the King Edward VII-class battleships. These ships carried a heavy secondary battery of 9.2-inch (230 mm) guns, which prompted the French Naval General Staff to request that the last four Républiques be redesigned to include a heavier secondary battery in response. Ironically, the designer, Louis-Émile Bertin, had proposed such an armament for the République class, but the General Staff had rejected it since the larger guns had a slower rate of fire than the smaller 164 mm (6.5 in) guns that had been selected. Because the ships were broadly similar apart from their armament, the Libertés are sometimes considered to be a sub-class of the République type.

Justice was 135.25 meters (443 ft 9 in) long overall and had a beam of 24.25 m (79 ft 7 in) and an average draft of 8.2 m (26 ft 11 in). She displaced up to 14,900 metric tons (14,700 long tons) at full load. The battleship was powered by three vertical triple-expansion steam engines, each driving one propeller shaft using steam provided by twenty-four Niclausse boilers. They were rated at 17,500 metric horsepower (17,300 ihp) and provided a top speed of 18 knots (33 km/h; 21 mph). Coal storage amounted to 1,800 t (1,800 long tons; 2,000 short tons), which provided a maximum range of 8,400 nautical miles (15,600 km; 9,700 mi) at a cruising speed of 10 knots (19 km/h; 12 mph). She had a crew of 32 officers and 710 enlisted men.

Justice's main battery consisted of four 305 mm (12 in) Modèle 1893/96 guns mounted in two twin-gun turrets, one forward and one aft of the superstructure. The secondary battery consisted of ten 194 mm (7.6 in) Modèle 1902 guns; six were mounted in single turrets, and four in casemates in the hull. She also carried thirteen 65 mm (2.6 in) Modèle 1902 guns and ten 47 mm (1.9 in) Modèle 1902 guns for defense against torpedo boats. The ship was also armed with two 450 mm (17.7 in) torpedo tubes, which were submerged in the hull on the broadside.

The ship's main belt was 280 mm (11 in) thick in the central citadel, and was connected to two armored decks; the upper deck was 54 mm (2.1 in) thick while the lower deck was 51 mm (2 in) thick, with 70 mm (2.8 in) sloped sides. The main battery guns were protected by up to 360 mm (14.2 in) of armor on the fronts of the turrets, while the secondary turrets had 156 mm (6.1 in) of armor on the faces. The casemates were protected with 174 mm (6.9 in) of steel plate. The conning tower had 266 mm (10.5 in) thick sides.

=== Modifications ===
Illustration of Justice steaming

The navy carried out tests to determine whether the main battery turrets could be modified to increase the elevation, and hence the range, of the guns, which determined that the turrets could not be altered. Instead, the navy found that tanks on either side of the vessel could be flooded to induce a heel of 2 degrees, increasing the maximum range of the guns from 12,500 to 13,500 m (13,700 to 14,800 yd). New motors were installed in the secondary turrets in 1915–1916 to improve their training and elevation rates. Also in 1915, the 47 mm guns located on either side of the bridge were removed and the two on the aft superstructure were moved to the roof of the rear turret. On 8 December 1915, the naval command issued orders that the light battery was to be revised to eight 47 mm guns and ten 65 mm (2.6 in) guns. The light battery was revised again in 1916, with four 47 mm guns being converted with high-angle anti-aircraft mounts. They were placed atop the rear main battery turret and the number 7 and 8 secondary turret roofs.

In 1912–1913, the ship received two 2 m (6 ft 7 in) Barr & Stroud rangefinders; by the end of World War I, the ship had been fitted with two 2.74 m (9 ft) rangefinders in addition to the 2 m rangefinders. One of the latter was moved to the aft superstructure and configured for high-angle fire control.

== Service history ==
=== Construction – 1910 ===
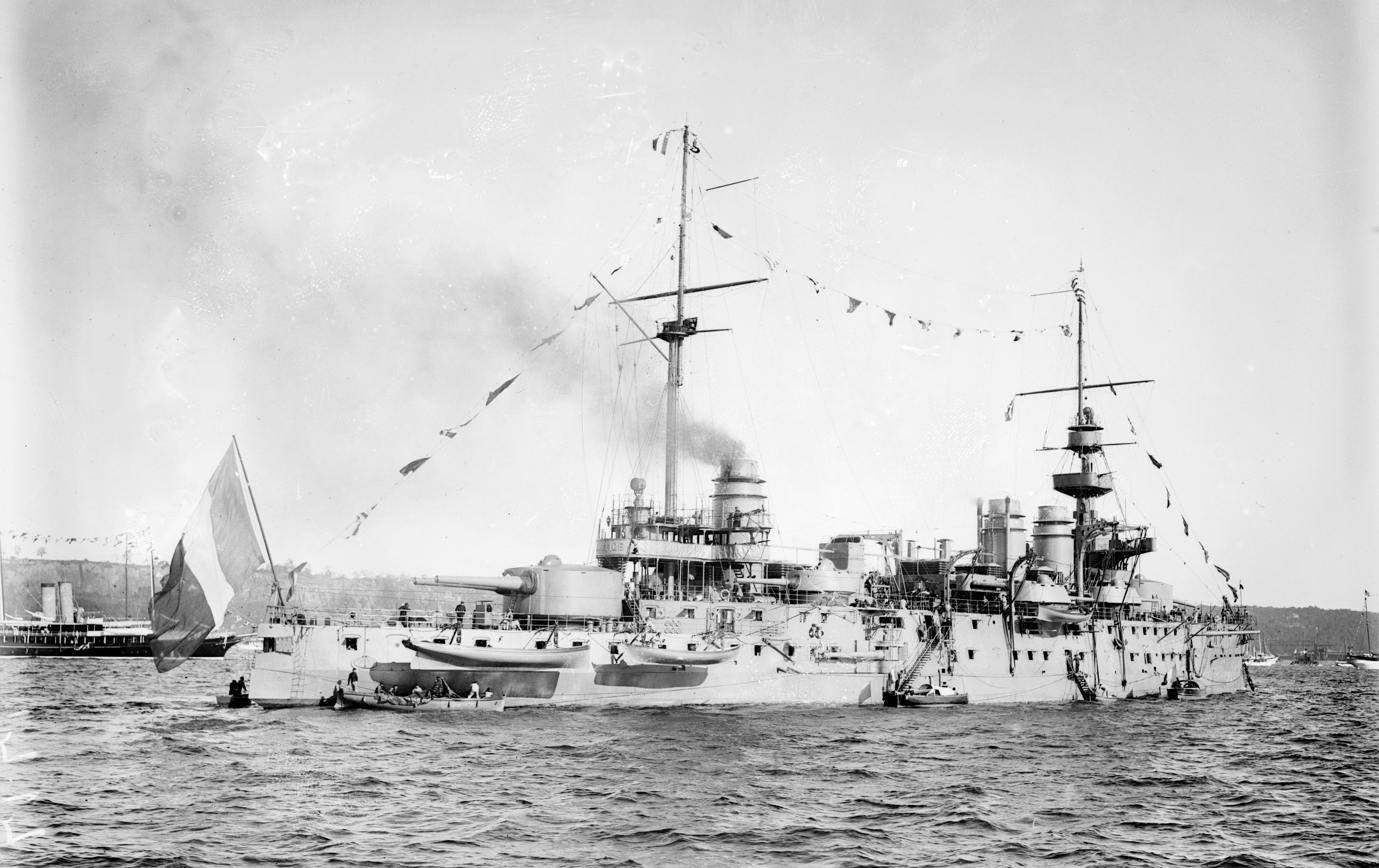
Justice at the Hudson–Fulton Celebration in the United States

With an initial budget of 41,565,620 French francs, Justice was laid down at the La Seyne shipyard in Toulon on 1 April 1903, launched on 27 October 1904, and completed on 15 April 1908. This was over a year after the revolutionary British battleship HMS Dreadnought entered service, which had rendered pre-dreadnoughts like Justice outdated. After commissioning, Justice was assigned to the 2nd Division of the Mediterranean Squadron, serving as its flagship, along with her sisters Liberté and Vérité. Contre-amiral (CA—Rear admiral) Jules Le Pord was the divisional commander at that time, and he came aboard the ship on 16 April. From 10 June into July the Mediterranean and Northern Squadrons conducted their annual maneuvers off Bizerte. The 2nd Division ships visited Bizerte in October. On 30 December, Justice, Vérité, and the destroyers Carquois and Fanfare carried relief aid to Messina, Sicily to help survivors of an earthquake there.

The entire squadron was moored in Villefranche in February 1909 and thereafter conducted training exercises off Corsica, followed by a naval review in Villefranche for President Armand Fallières on 26 April. During this period of training, on 17 March, Justice and the battleships Liberté, Patrie, and République conducted gunnery training, using the old ironclad Tempête as a target. In June, République, Justice, and the protected cruiser Galilée got underway for training in the Atlantic; they met Patrie, Démocratie, Liberté, and the armored cruiser Ernest Renan at Cádiz, Spain on 12 June. Training included serving as targets for the fleet's submarines in the Pertuis d'Antioche strait. The ships then steamed north to La Pallice, where they conducted tests with their wireless sets and gunnery training in Quiberon Bay. From 8 to 15 July, the ships lay at Brest and the next day, they steamed to Le Havre. There, they met the Northern Squadron for another fleet review for Fallières on 17 July. Ten days later, the combined fleet steamed to Cherbourg, where they held another fleet review, this time during the visit of Czar Nicholas II of Russia.

On 12 September, Justice and the other 2nd Division battleships departed from Brest, bound for the United States. There they represented France during the Hudson–Fulton Celebration, which marked the 300th anniversary of the European discovery of the Hudson River. The ships arrived back in Toulon on 27 October. Justice joined Patrie, République, Vérité, Démocratie, and Suffren for a simulated attack on the port of Nice on 18 February 1910. The ships of the 1st Squadron held training exercises off Sardinia and Algeria from 21 May to 4 June, followed by combined maneuvers with the 2nd Squadron from 7 to 18 June. Justice began having trouble with her main battery, so she went into the shipyard in Toulon from 13 to 21 July for repairs. An outbreak of typhoid among the crews of the battleships in early December forced the navy to confine them to Golfe-Juan to contain the fever. By 15 December, the outbreak had subsided.

=== 1911–1914 ===
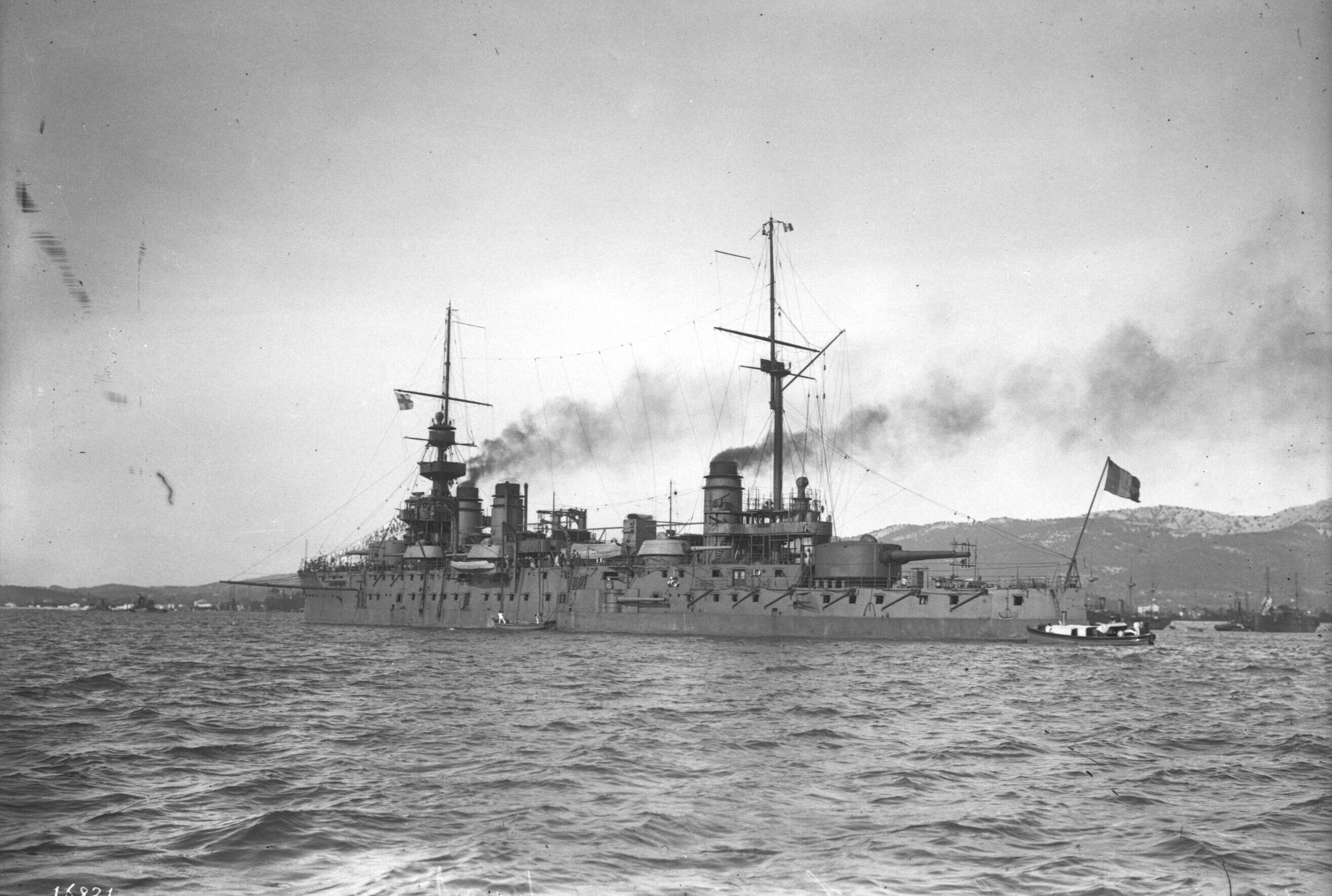
Justice in Toulon, October 1911

On 16 April 1911, Justice and the rest of the fleet escorted Vérité, which had aboard Fallières, the Naval Minister Théophile Delcassé, and Charles Dumont, the Minister of Public Works, Posts and Telegraphs, to Bizerte. They arrived two days later and held a fleet review that included two British battleships, two Italian battleships, and a Spanish cruiser on 19 April. The fleet returned to Toulon on 29 April, where Fallières doubled the crews' rations and suspended any punishments to thank the men for their performance. Justice and the rest of 1st Squadron and the armored cruisers Ernest Renan and Léon Gambetta went on a cruise in the western Mediterranean in May and June, visiting a number of ports including Cagliari, Bizerte, Bône, Philippeville, Algiers, and Bougie. By 1 August, the battleships of the Danton class had begun to enter service, and they were assigned to the 1st Squadron, displacing the Liberté and République-class ships to the 2nd Squadron. On 4 September, both squadrons held a major fleet review for Fallières off Toulon. The fleet then departed on 11 September for maneuvers off Golfe-Juan and Marseille, returning to Toulon on 16 September.

On 25 September, Liberté was destroyed by a magazine explosion; a commission was convened aboard Justice the following day to investigate the accident. Just a month later, on 26 October, Justice also caught fire, and two of her 194 mm and one of her 47 mm magazines had to be flooded to prevent a similar explosion. The fire was believed to have been started by a short circuit in the electrical system near the forward magazines. The fire had reached the ammunition in the magazines when the ship's commander ordered the magazines to be flooded, averting a catastrophic explosion. This occurred just days after the battleship Suffren had to flood her magazines to put out another accidental fire. The fleet thereafter made cruises to Les Salins d'Hyères, Le Lavandou, and Porquerolles through 15 December. At some point in 1911, the ship was featured in the film A Day on the French battleship "Justice".

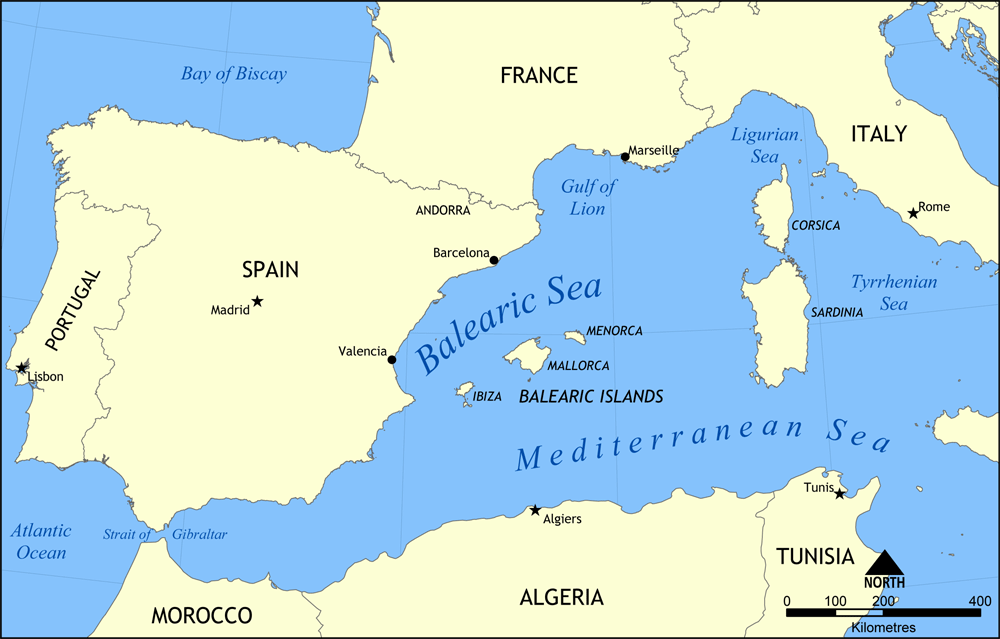
Map of the western Mediterranean, where Justice spent the majority of her peacetime career

On 19 January 1912, Justice and the battleship Danton steamed to Malta in company with the destroyers Lansquenet and Carabinier. Vérité joined the ships en route from Bizerte, and the five vessels arrived in Valletta on 22 January. There, they met King George V and Queen Mary of Britain, then returning from their voyage to India that year. On 24 April, Justice went to sea with République for gunnery training off the Hyères roadstead; they were joined by Patrie and Vérité the next day. Admiral Augustin Boué de Lapeyrère inspected both battleship squadrons in Golfe-Juan from 2 to 12 July, after which the ships cruised first to Corsica and then to Algeria. The rest of the year passed uneventfully for Justice.

In early 1913, Justice and the rest of the 2nd Squadron took part in training exercises off Le Lavandou. The French fleet, which by then included sixteen battleships, held large-scale maneuvers between Toulon and Sardinia beginning on 19 May. The exercises concluded with a fleet review for President Raymond Poincaré. Gunnery practice followed from 1 to 4 July. The 2nd Squadron departed Toulon on 23 August with the armored cruisers Jules Ferry and Edgar Quinet and two destroyer flotillas to conduct training exercises in the Atlantic. While en route to Brest, the ships stopped in Tangier, Royan, Le Verdon, La Pallice, Quiberon Bay, and Cherbourg. They reached Brest on 20 September, where they met a Russian squadron of four battleships and five cruisers. The ships then steamed back south, stopping in Cádiz, Tangier, Mers El Kébir, Algiers, and Bizerte before ultimately arriving back in Toulon on 1 November. On 3 December, République, Justice, Vérité, and Démocratie conducted torpedo training and range-finding drills. While anchored at Les Salins on the night of 19/20 December, heavy winds blew Démocratie into Justice; Démocratie's port screw cut through Justice's starboard anchor chain and the collision knocked two of Justice's armor plates from her bow. Both vessels were forced to return to Toulon for repairs.

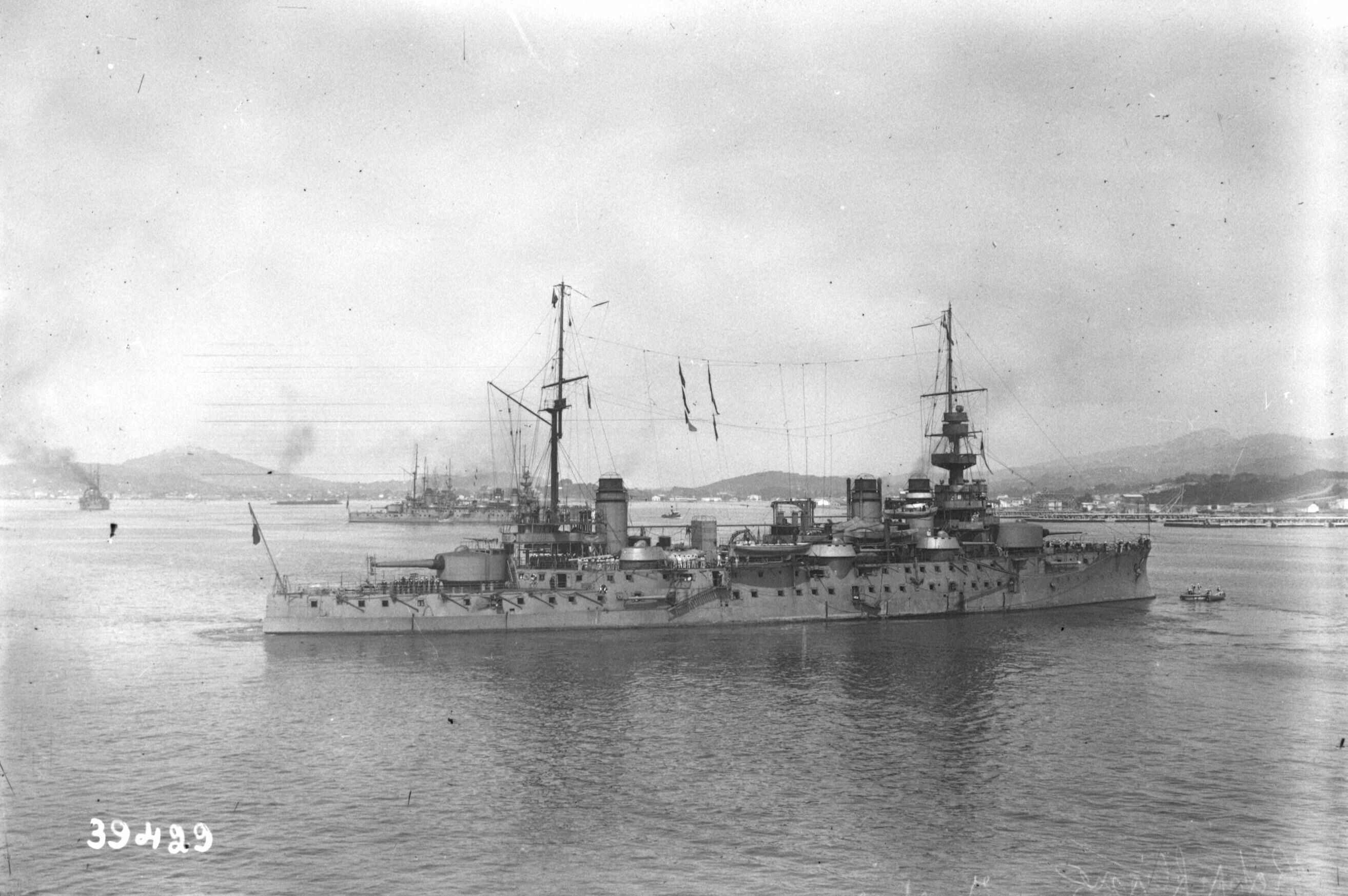
Justice in Toulon, May 1914

After completing repairs, Justice returned to Les Salins in early 1914, where she and the other 2nd Squadron ships conducted torpedo training on 19 January. Later that month they steamed to Bizerte before returning to Toulon on 6 February. On 4 March, Justice, Démocratie, Vérité, and République joined the 1st Squadron battleships and the 2nd Light Squadron for a visit to Porto-Vecchio, Sardinia. On 30 March, the 2nd Squadron ships steamed to Malta to visit the British Mediterranean Fleet, remaining there until 3 April. The squadron visited various ports in June, but following the assassination of Archduke Franz Ferdinand and the ensuing July Crisis, the fleet remained close to port, making only short training sorties as international tensions rose.

=== World War I ===
Following the outbreak of World War I in July 1914, France announced general mobilization on 1 August. The next day, Boué de Lapeyrère ordered the entire French fleet to begin raising steam at 22:15 so the ships could sortie early the next day. Faced with the prospect that the German Mediterranean Division—centered on the battlecruiser Goeben—might attack the troopships carrying the French Army in North Africa to metropolitan France, the French fleet was tasked with providing heavy escort to the convoys. Accordingly, Justice and the rest of the 2nd Squadron were sent to Algiers, where they joined a group of seven passenger ships that had a contingent of 7,000 troops from XIX Corps aboard. By this time, Justice was serving as the flagship of CA Tracou, the commander of the 2nd Division of the 2nd Squadron. While at sea, the new dreadnought battleships Courbet and Jean Bart and the Danton-class battleships Condorcet and Vergniaud, took over as the convoy's escort. Instead of attacking the convoys, Goeben bombarded Bône and Philippeville and then fled east to the Ottoman Empire.

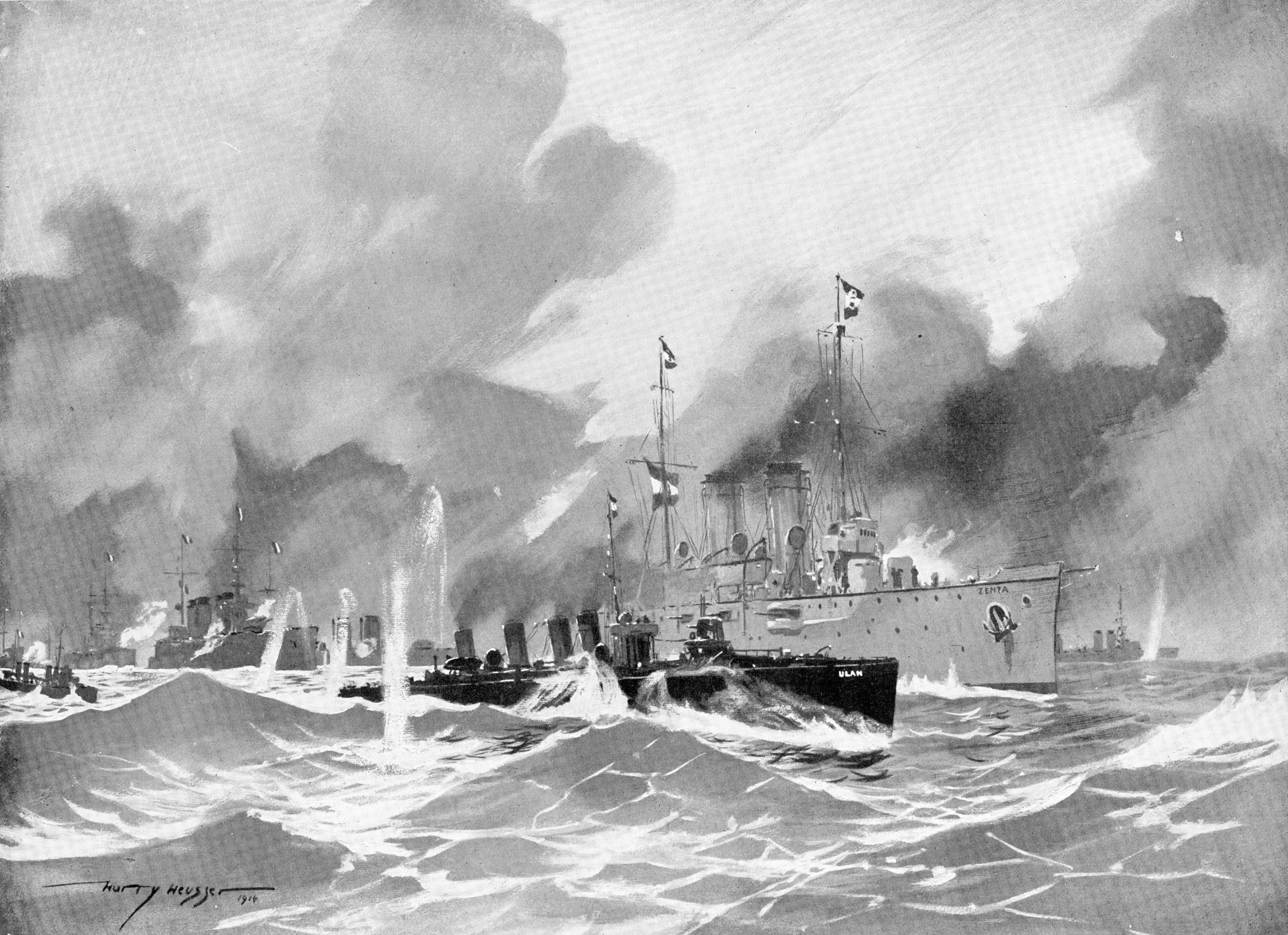
The Austro-Hungarian Zenta and Ulan under fire from the French fleet at the Battle of Antivari

On 12 August, France and Britain declared war on the Austro-Hungarian Empire as the war continued to widen. The 1st and 2nd Squadrons were therefore sent to the southern Adriatic Sea to contain the Austro-Hungarian Navy. On 15 August, the two squadrons arrived off the Strait of Otranto, where they met the patrolling British cruisers HMS Defence and HMS Weymouth north of Othonoi. Boué de Lapeyrère then took the fleet into the Adriatic in an attempt to force a battle with the Austro-Hungarian fleet; the following morning, the British and French cruisers spotted vessels in the distance that, on closing with them, turned out to be the Austro-Hungarian protected cruiser SMS Zenta and the torpedo boat Ulan, which were trying to blockade the coast of Montenegro. In the ensuing Battle of Antivari, Boué de Lapeyrère initially ordered his battleships to fire warning shots, but this caused confusion among the fleet's gunners that allowed Ulan to escape. The slower Zenta attempted to evade, but she quickly received several hits that disabled her engines and set her on fire. She sank shortly thereafter and the Anglo-French fleet withdrew. In the course of the battle, a shell exploded in Justice's starboard forward 194 mm casemate gun.

The French fleet patrolled the southern end of the Adriatic for the next three days with the expectation that the Austro-Hungarians would counterattack, but they did not. At 09:20 on 17 August, Justice and Démocratie collided in heavy fog; the latter vessel lost her rudder and center screw, while Justice had her bow dented in. Justice withdrew to Malta for repairs, which only took four days to complete, and she returned to the fleet on 27 August. On 1 September, the French battleships bombarded Austrian fortifications at Cattaro in an attempt to draw out the Austro-Hungarian fleet, which again refused to take the bait. In addition, many of the ships still had shells loaded from the battle with Zenta, and the guns could only be unloaded by firing them. On 18–19 September, the fleet made another incursion into the Adriatic, steaming as far north as the island of Lissa.

Justice and other ships of the French fleet

The fleet continued these operations in October and November, including a sweep off the coast of Montenegro to cover a group of merchant vessels replenishing their coal there. Throughout this period, the battleships rotated through Malta or Toulon for periodic maintenance; Corfu became the primary naval base in the area. The patrols continued through late December, when an Austro-Hungarian U-boat torpedoed Jean Bart, leading to the decision by the French naval command to withdraw the main battle fleet from direct operations in the Adriatic. For the rest of the month, the fleet remained at Navarino Bay. The battle fleet thereafter occupied itself with patrols between Kythira and Crete; these sweeps continued until 7 May. Following the Italian entry into the war on the side of France, the French fleet handed control of the Adriatic operations to the Italian Regia Marina (Royal Navy) and withdrew its fleet to Malta and Bizerte, the latter becoming the main fleet base.

Justice and Démocratie were detached from the main fleet in January 1916 to reinforce the Dardanelles Division, though the Allies evacuated their forces fighting there that month. In June, the French battle fleet was reorganized; Justice, her two sisters, the two République-class ships, and Suffren were assigned to the 3rd Squadron. The ships were tasked with pressuring the Greek government, which to that point had remained neutral, though King Constantine I's wife Sophie was the sister of the German Kaiser Wilhelm II. The French and British were growing increasingly frustrated by Constantine's refusal to enter the war, and sent the 3rd Squadron to Salonika try to influence events in the country. Over the course of June and July, the ships alternated between Salonika and Mudros, and later that month the fleet was transferred to Cephalonia.

In August, a pro-Allied group launched a coup against the Greek monarchy in the Noemvriana, which the Allies sought to support. Several French ships sent men ashore in Athens on 1 December to support the coup, but they were quickly defeated by the royalist Greek Army. In response, the British and French fleet imposed a blockade of the royalist-controlled parts of the country. By June 1917, Constantine had been forced to abdicate, and the 3rd Squadron was disbanded; Justice returned to the 2nd Squadron, which included the other Liberté-class ships and three of the Danton-class battleships, on 1 July. They remained in Corfu, largely immobilized due to shortages of coal, preventing training until late September 1918. In late October, members of the Central Powers began signing armistices with the British and French, signaling the end of the war. The 2nd Squadron ships were sent to Constantinople to oversee the surrender of Ottoman forces, and Justice and Démocratie proceeded into the Black Sea, where they supervised the transfer of Russian warships that had been seized by the Germans back to Russian control.

=== Postwar career ===
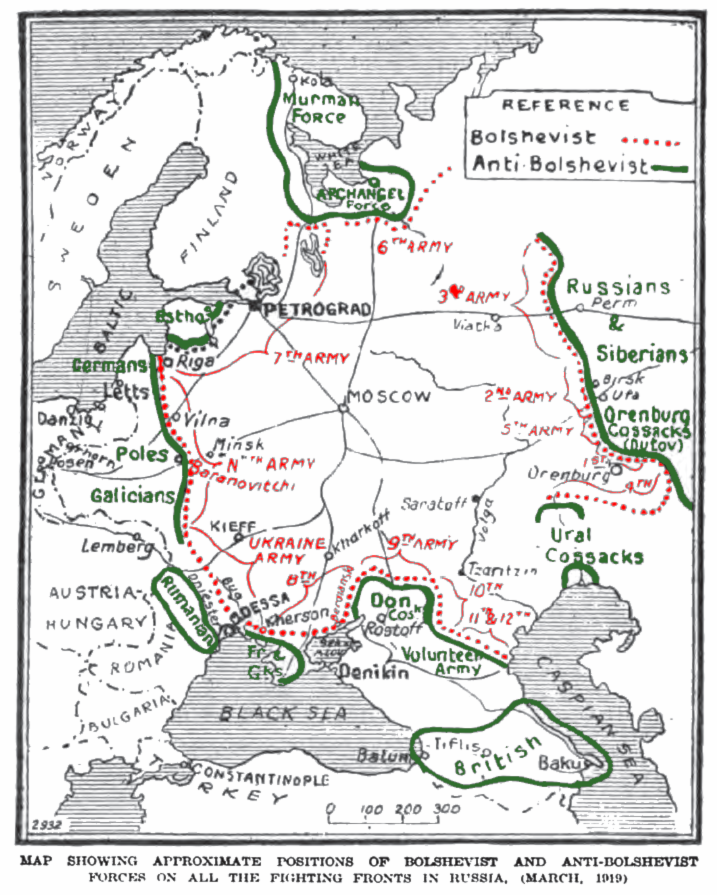
Map of the approximate positions of the Bolshevik and White forces in Russia in 1919

On 8 December, the French naval command ordered Justice to steam to Odessa to join the battleship Mirabeau, which was observing clashes between the communist Bolshevik and White forces during the Russian Civil War, part of the Allied intervention into the conflict. Three days later, when the Bolshevik forces appeared ready to advance into the city, Justice, Mirabeau, and the armored cruiser Jules Michelet sent landing parties ashore to strengthen the White defenses. On 1 January 1919, Justice had returned to Constantinople; by that time, the French fleet in the Black Sea had been designated the 2nd Squadron, and it also included Démocratie, the Danton-class ships Diderot and Vergniaud, and the dreadnought France. The French squadron was thereafter tasked with supporting the White defenses of Sevastopol and blockading the coast of Ukraine, which had largely fallen into the control of the Bolsheviks.

By mid-April, the French command had reached the decision to withdraw French forces from active participation in the conflict, which led the crews of the ships to believe they would soon return home. When, on 19 April, it had become clear that this was not the case, men aboard Justice, France, and Jean Bart mutinied. The situation worsened after a group of Greek soldiers fired into a crowd of demonstrators ashore; one French sailor was killed and another five were injured. Justice's crew was enraged, and began discussing opening fire on the Greek battleship Kilkis, moored nearby. Justice's captain ordered his ship's guns disabled by removing their breech blocks to prevent an attack. This intervention was enough to convince the crew to abandon the mutiny, though the crews of the dreadnoughts continued. The situation was eventually defused by returning the French squadron back to France, one of the mutineers' primary demands.

In the meantime, Mirabeau had run aground and been badly damaged in February and was refloated in April and taken into Sevastopol for repairs. The imminent threat of the Bolshevik conquest of the city forced her to be towed out of port by Justice on 5 May. She took the crippled battleship to Constantinople, where they stayed from 7 to 15 May before departing for France. On passing through the Dardanelles, both ships' crews held ceremonies to honor the men killed aboard the battleship Bouvet during the Dardanelles campaign in 1915. To avoid further damage to Mirabeau, Justice was limited to a speed of 7 knots (13 km/h; 8.1 mph) for the entire 1,800-nautical-mile (3,300 km; 2,100 mi) voyage. The ships reached Toulon on 24 May. On 6 June, Justice again acted as a tug, taking the Elan-class minesweeping sloop Commandant Rivière from Toulon to Brest, arriving there on 17 June. Justice thereafter was reduced to a training ship. On 1 April 1920, she was placed in special reserve and towed to the naval station of Landévennec on 27 April. She was decommissioned on 1 March 1921 and struck on 29 November. She was sold to ship breakers on 30 December, towed to Hamburg, Germany, and broken up in 1922.
