= French battleship Patrie =

French Republique-class predreadnoughts

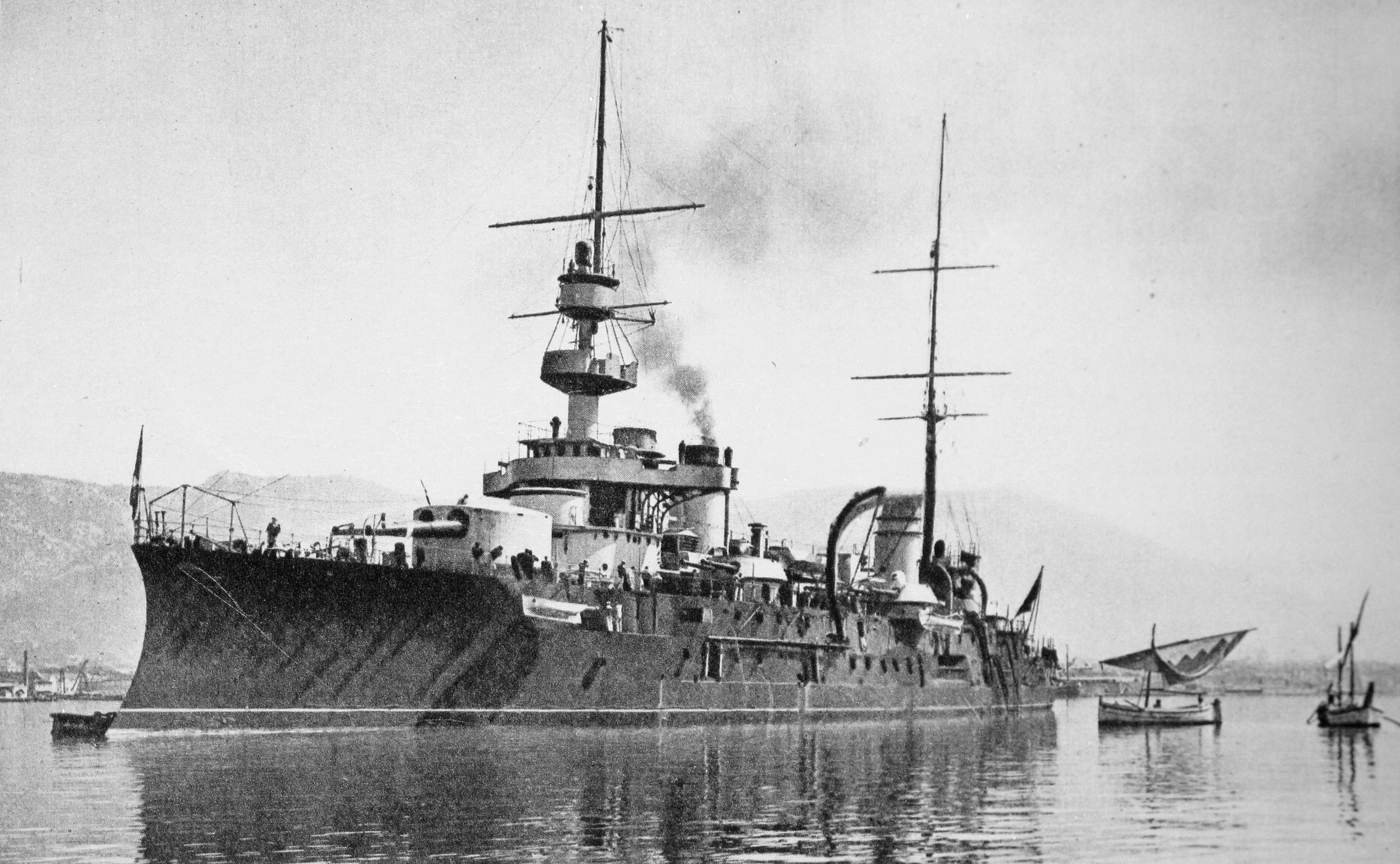
- Patrie at her mooring

History

France
- Name: Patrie
- Namesake: Fatherland
- Laid down: 1 April 1902
- Launched: 17 December 1903
- Commissioned: 1 July 1907
- Decommissioned: 20 June 1924
- Fate: Broken up for scrap, 1937

General characteristics
- Class & type: République-class battleship
- Displacement: 14,870 metric tons (14,640 long tons)
- Length: 135.25 meters (443 ft 9 in) loa
- Beam: 24.25 m (79 ft 7 in)
- Draft: 8.2 m (26 ft 11 in)
- Installed power: 24 × Niclausse boilers; 17,500 metric horsepower (17,260 ihp)
- Propulsion: 3 × triple-expansion steam engines; 3 × screw propellers
- Speed: 18 knots (33 km/h; 21 mph)
- Range: 8,400 nautical miles (15,600 km; 9,700 mi) at 10 knots (19 km/h; 12 mph)
- Complement: 32 officers; 710 enlisted men
- Armament: 4 × 305 mm (12 in) Modèle 1893/96 guns; 18 × 164 mm (6.5 in) Modèle 1896 guns; 13 × 65 mm (2.6 in) Modèle 1902 guns; 8 × 47 mm (1.9 in) guns; 2 × 450 mm (17.7 in) torpedo tubes
- Armor: Belt: 280 mm (11 in); Primary turrets: 360 mm (14.2 in); Secondary turrets: 138 mm (5.4 in); Conning tower: 266 mm (10.5 in); Upper deck: 54 mm (2.1 in); Lower deck: 51 mm (2 in)

Patrie was the second and final member of the République class of pre-dreadnought battleships of the French Navy built between her keel laying in April 1902 and her commissioning in July 1907. Armed with a main battery of four 305 mm (12 in) guns, she was outclassed before even entering service by the revolutionary British battleship HMS Dreadnought, that had been commissioned the previous December and was armed with a battery of ten guns of the same caliber. Though built to an obsolescent design, Patrie proved to be a workhorse of the French fleet, particularly during World War I.

During the ship's peacetime career, Patrie served with the Mediterranean Squadron; this period was occupied with training exercises and cruises in the western Mediterranean Sea and the Atlantic. She served as the squadron's flagship until replaced by newer vessels in 1911. Following the outbreak of war in July 1914, Patrie was used to escort troopship convoys carrying elements of the French Army from French North Africa to face the Germans invading northern France. She thereafter steamed to contain the Austro-Hungarian Navy in the Adriatic Sea, taking part in the minor Battle of Antivari in August. The increasing threat of Austro-Hungarian U-boats and the unwillingness of the Austro-Hungarian fleet to engage in battle led to a period of inactivity that ended with a transfer of the vessel to the Dardanelles Division fighting in the Gallipoli Campaign, where she bombarded Ottoman forces.

Following the Allied withdrawal from Gallipoli in 1916, Patrie became involved in events in Greece, being stationed in Salonika to put pressure on the Greek government to enter the war on the side of the Allies. She contributed men to a landing party that went ashore in Athens to support a pro-Allied coup. She saw little activity in 1917 and 1918 after the coup succeeded. Following the end of the war in late 1918, she was sent to Constantinople to support the Allied intervention in the Russian Civil War, though she took no active role and served as a barracks ship. She then became a training ship, a role she filled in one capacity or another until 1936, when she was withdrawn from service and sold for scrap the following year.

== Design ==
Line-drawing of the République class

The ships of the République class marked a significant improvement over earlier French battleships, being significantly larger and better-armed and armored than the preceding battleship Suffren. Designed by Louis-Émile Bertin, the ships incorporated a new armor layout that included a more comprehensive armored citadel that would better resist flooding than the shallow side armor used in earlier vessels.

Patrie was 135.25 meters (443 ft 9 in) long overall and had a beam of 24.25 m (79 ft 7 in) and an average draft of 8.2 m (26 ft 11 in). She displaced 14,870 metric tons (14,640 long tons) at full load. She was powered by three vertical triple expansion engines with twenty-four Niclausse boilers. They were rated at 17,500 metric horsepower (17,260 ihp) and provided a top speed of 18 knots (33 km/h; 21 mph). Coal storage amounted to 1,800 t (1,770 long tons; 1,980 short tons), which provided a maximum range of 8,400 nautical miles (15,600 km; 9,700 mi) at a cruising speed of 10 knots (19 km/h; 12 mph). She had a crew of 32 officers and 710 enlisted men.

Patrie's main battery consisted of four Canon de 305 mm Modèle 1893/96 guns mounted in two twin-gun turrets, one forward and one aft. The secondary battery consisted of eighteen Canon de 164 mm Modèle 1893 guns; twelve were mounted in twin turrets, and six were in casemates in the hull. She also carried twenty-four 47 mm (1.9 in) guns. The ship was also armed with two 450 mm (17.7 in) torpedo tubes, which were submerged in the hull.

The ship's main belt was 280 mm (11.0 in) thick in the central citadel, and was connected to two armored decks; the upper deck was 54 mm (2.1 in) thick while the lower deck was 51 mm (2.0 in) thick, with 70 mm (2.8 in) sloped sides. The main battery guns were protected by up to 360 mm (14.2 in) of armor on the fronts of the turrets, while the secondary turrets had 138 mm (5.4 in) of armor on the faces. The conning tower had 266 mm (10.5 in) thick sides.

=== Modifications ===
Tests to determine whether the main battery turrets could be modified to increase the elevation of the guns (and hence their range) proved to be impossible, but the Navy determined that tanks on either side of the vessel could be flooded to induce a heel of 2 degrees. This increased the maximum range of the guns from 12,500 to 13,500 m (41,000 to 44,300 ft). New motors were installed in the secondary turrets in 1915–1916 to improve their training and elevation rates. Also in 1915, the 47 mm guns located on either side of the bridge were removed and the two on the aft superstructure were moved to the roof of the rear turret. On 8 December 1915, the naval command issued orders that the light battery was to be revised to just four of the 47 mm guns and eight 65 mm (2.6 in) guns. The light battery was revised again in 1916, with the four 47 mm guns being converted with high-angle anti-aircraft mounts. They were placed atop the rear main battery turret and the number 5 and 6 secondary turret roofs.

In 1912–1913, the ship received two 2 m (6 ft 7 in) Barr & Stroud rangefinders, though Patrie later had these replaced with 2.74 m (9 ft 0 in) rangefinders taken from the dreadnought battleship Courbet. Tests revealed the wider rangefinders were more susceptible to working themselves out of alignment, so the navy decided to retain the 2 m version for the other battleships of the fleet. By 1916, the command determined to modernize the fleet's rangefinding equipment, and Patrie was fitted with one 2.74 m and two 2 m rangefinders for her primary and secondary guns, and one .8 m (2 ft 7 in) Barr & Stroud rangefinder for her anti-aircraft guns.

== Service history ==
=== Construction – 1909 ===
Patrie was laid down at the La Seyne shipyard on 1 April 1902, launched on 17 December 1903, and completed on 1 July 1907, several months after the revolutionary British battleship HMS Dreadnought entered service, which rendered the pre-dreadnoughts like Patrie outdated. While Patrie was still fitting-out, the nearby battleship Iéna suffered a catastrophic magazine explosion that destroyed the vessel. Her commanding officer attempted to flood the dock holding Iéna to put out the inferno by firing one of Patrie's secondary guns at the dock gate, but the shell bounced off and did not penetrate it. The dock was finally flooded when Ensign de Vaisseau Jean-Antoine Roux (who was killed shortly afterward by fragments from the ship) managed to open the sluice gates. In May, the ship conducted sea trials, and on 29 May, a condenser pipe in one of her boilers burst. Several stokers were scalded, and the ship had to return to Toulon to have the condenser pipe replaced.

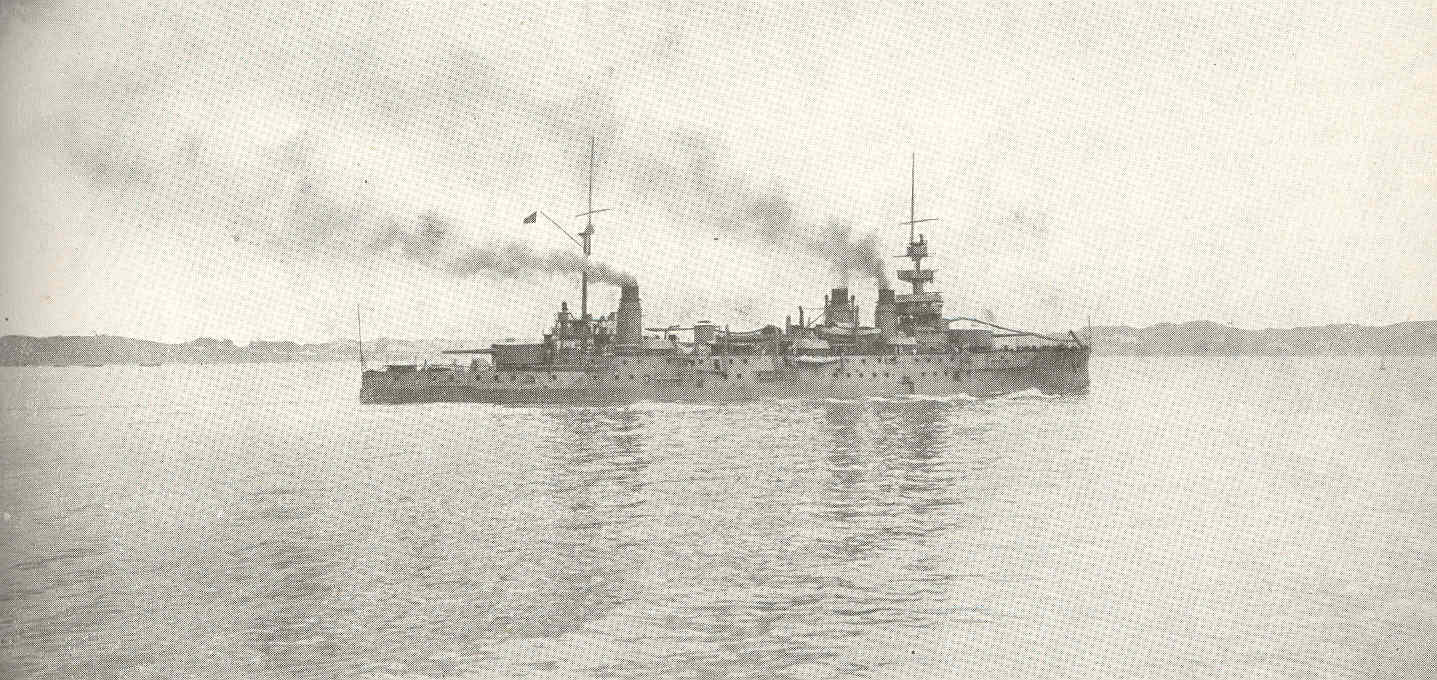
Patrie steaming off Toulon

After entering service, she was assigned to the 1st Division of the Mediterranean Squadron, along with her sister République and Suffren, the flagship of both the division and the squadron. The fleet thereafter embarked on its annual summer maneuvers, which lasted until 31 July. The Mediterranean Squadron joined the Northern Squadron for exercises in the western Mediterranean. On 5 November, Patrie replaced Suffren as the squadron flagship, hoisting the flag of Vice-amiral (VA—Vice Admiral) Germinet. On 13 January 1908, Patrie and the battleships République, Charlemagne, Gaulois, Saint Louis, Masséna, and Jauréguiberry steamed to Golfe-Juan and then to Villefranche-sur-Mer, where they remained for more than a month. During this period of training, on 17 March, Patrie, République, Justice, and Liberté conducted shooting training, using the old ironclad Tempête as a target. In June and July, the Mediterranean and Northern Squadrons conducted their annual maneuvers, this time off Bizerte. In October, the 1st Division ships, which by then consisted of Patrie and République steamed to Barcelona, Spain. The ships were inspected by King Alfonso XIII, who boarded Patrie during the visit.

By 5 January 1909, Germinet had been replaced by VA Fauque de Jonquières, following the publication of a letter in which Germinet criticized the fleet's ammunition supply. While in Villefranche, Patrie hosted Albert I, Prince of Monaco during his visit to the port from 18 to 24 February. After his departure, the Mediterranean Squadron conducted training exercises off Corsica, followed by a naval review in Villefranche for President Armand Fallières on 26 April. Patrie, Démocratie, Liberté, and the armored cruiser Ernest Renan steamed into the Atlantic for training exercises on 2 June; while at sea ten days later, they rendezvoused with République, Justice, and the protected cruiser Galilée at Cádiz, Spain. Training included serving as targets for the fleet's submarines in the Pertuis d'Antioche strait. The ships then steamed north to La Pallice, where they conducted tests with their wireless telegraphy sets and shooting training in Quiberon Bay. From 8 to 15 July, the ships lay at Brest and the next day, they steamed to Le Havre. There, they met the Northern Squadron for another fleet review for Fallières on 17 July. Ten days later, the combined fleet steamed to Cherbourg, where they held another fleet review, this time during the visit of Czar Nicholas II of Russia. Patrie, République, and Démocratie departed for Toulon on 17 August and arrived on 6 September.

=== 1910–1914 ===
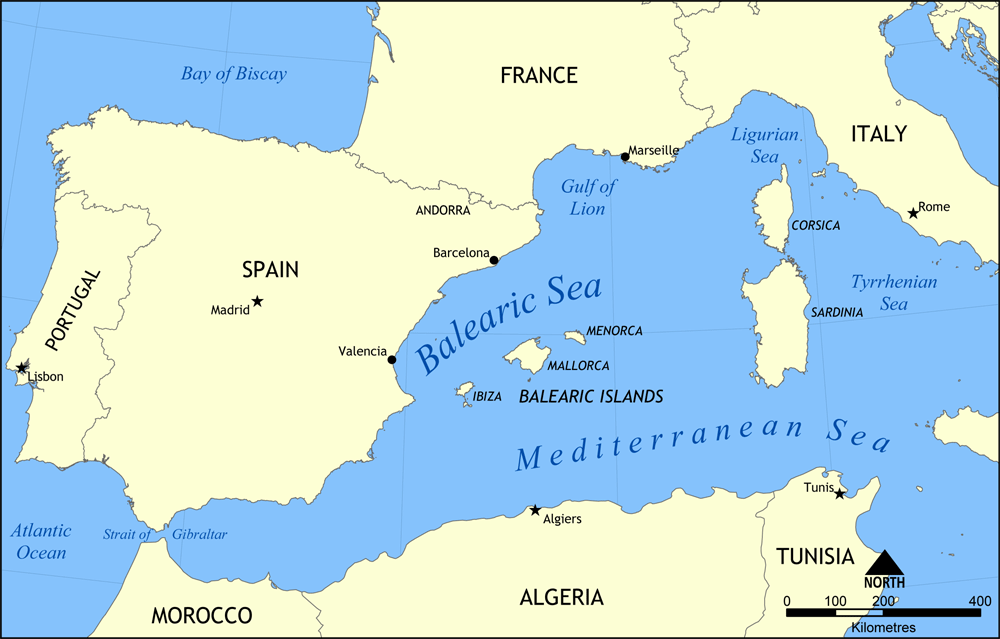
Map of the western Mediterranean, where Patrie spent the majority of her peacetime career

Patrie joined République, Justice, Vérité, Démocratie, and Suffren for a simulated attack on the port of Nice on 18 February. During the maneuvers, Patrie launched a torpedo that accidentally hit République, damaging her hull and forcing her to put into Toulon for repairs. She then steamed to Monaco for the opening of the Oceanographic Museum of Monaco in company with the destroyers Coutelas and Cognée on 29 March. She then returned for maneuvers off Sardinia and Algeria from 21 May to 4 June in company with République and Démocratie. Exercises with the rest of the Mediterranean Squadron followed from 7 to 18 June. An outbreak of typhoid among the crews of the battleships in early December forced the navy to confine them to Golfe-Juan to contain the fever. By 15 December, the outbreak had subsided.

VA Bellue replaced Fauque de Jonquières on 5 January 1911. On 16 April, Patrie and the rest of the fleet escorted Vérité, which had aboard Fallières, the Naval Minister Théophile Delcassé, and Charles Dumont, the Minister of Public Works, Posts and Telegraphs, to Bizerte. They arrived two days later and held a fleet review that included two British battleships, two Italian battleships, and a Spanish cruiser on 19 April. The fleet returned to Toulon on 29 April, where Fallières doubled the crews' rations and suspended any punishments to thank the men for their performance. Patrie and the rest of 1st Squadron and the armored cruisers Ernest Renan and Léon Gambetta went on a cruise in the western Mediterranean in May and June, visiting a number of ports including Cagliari, Bizerte, Bône, Philippeville, Algiers, and Bougie. By 1 August, the battleships of the Danton class had begun to enter service, and they were assigned to the 1st Squadron, displacing Patrie, République, and the Liberté-class ships to the 2nd Squadron.

The fleet held another fleet review outside Toulon on 4 September. Admiral Jauréguiberry took the fleet to sea on 11 September for maneuvers and visits to Golfe-Juan and Marseille, returning to port five days later. On 25 September, Liberté exploded while in Toulon, another French battleship claimed by unstable Poudre B propellant. Several ships in the harbor were damaged, though Patrie emerged unscathed. Despite the accident, the fleet continued with its normal routine of training exercises and cruises for the rest of the year. The 2nd Squadron conducted in maneuvers in April 1912, and on 25 April, Patrie and Vérité steamed to the Hyères roadstead for gunnery training. The two ships, joined by Justice, left Toulon on 21 May for a set of exercises held between Marseille and Villefranche; while at sea, the battleship Danton joined them, which had Admiral Augustin Boué de Lapeyrère and the British Prince of Wales aboard. Boué de Lapeyrère inspected both battleship squadrons in Golfe-Juan from 2 to 12 July, after which the ships cruised first to Corsica and then to Algeria.

VA de Marolles took command of the 2nd Squadron, hoisting his flag aboard Patrie on 6 January 1913. The ships then took part in training exercises off Le Lavandou. The French fleet, which by then included sixteen battleships, held large-scale maneuvers between Toulon and Sardinia beginning on 19 May. The exercises concluded with a fleet review for President Raymond Poincaré. Gunnery practice followed from 1 to 4 July. The 2nd Squadron departed Toulon on 23 August with the armored cruisers Jules Ferry and Edgar Quinet and two destroyer flotillas to conduct training exercises in the Atlantic. While en route to Brest, the ships stopped in Tangier, Royan, Le Verdon, La Pallice, Quiberon Bay, and Cherbourg. They reached Brest on 20 September, where they met a Russian squadron of four battleships and five cruisers. The ships then steamed back south, stopping in Cádiz, Tangier, Mers El Kébir, Algiers, and Bizerte before ultimately arriving back in Toulon on 1 November. The 2nd Squadron ships conducted torpedo training on 19 January 1914, and later that month they steamed to Bizerte, returning to Toulon on 6 February. The squadron visited various ports in June, but following the assassination of Archduke Franz Ferdinand and the ensuing July Crisis prompted the fleet to remain close to port, making only short training sorties as international tensions rose.

=== World War I ===
==== 1914–1915 ====
Following the outbreak of World War I in July 1914, France announced general mobilization on 1 August. The next day, Boué de Lapeyrère ordered the entire French fleet to begin raising steam at 22:15 so the ships could sortie early the next day. Faced with the prospect that the German Mediterranean Division—centered on the battlecruiser Goeben—might attack the troopships carrying the French Army in North Africa to metropolitan France, the French fleet was tasked with providing heavy escort to the convoys. Accordingly, Patrie and the rest of the 2nd Squadron were sent to Algiers, where they joined a group of seven passenger ships that had a contingent of 7,000 troops from XIX Corps aboard. While at sea, the new dreadnought battleships Courbet and Jean Bart and the Danton-class battleships Condorcet and Vergniaud, which took over as the convoy's escort. Instead of attacking the convoys, Goeben bombarded Bône and Philippeville and then fled east to the Ottoman Empire.

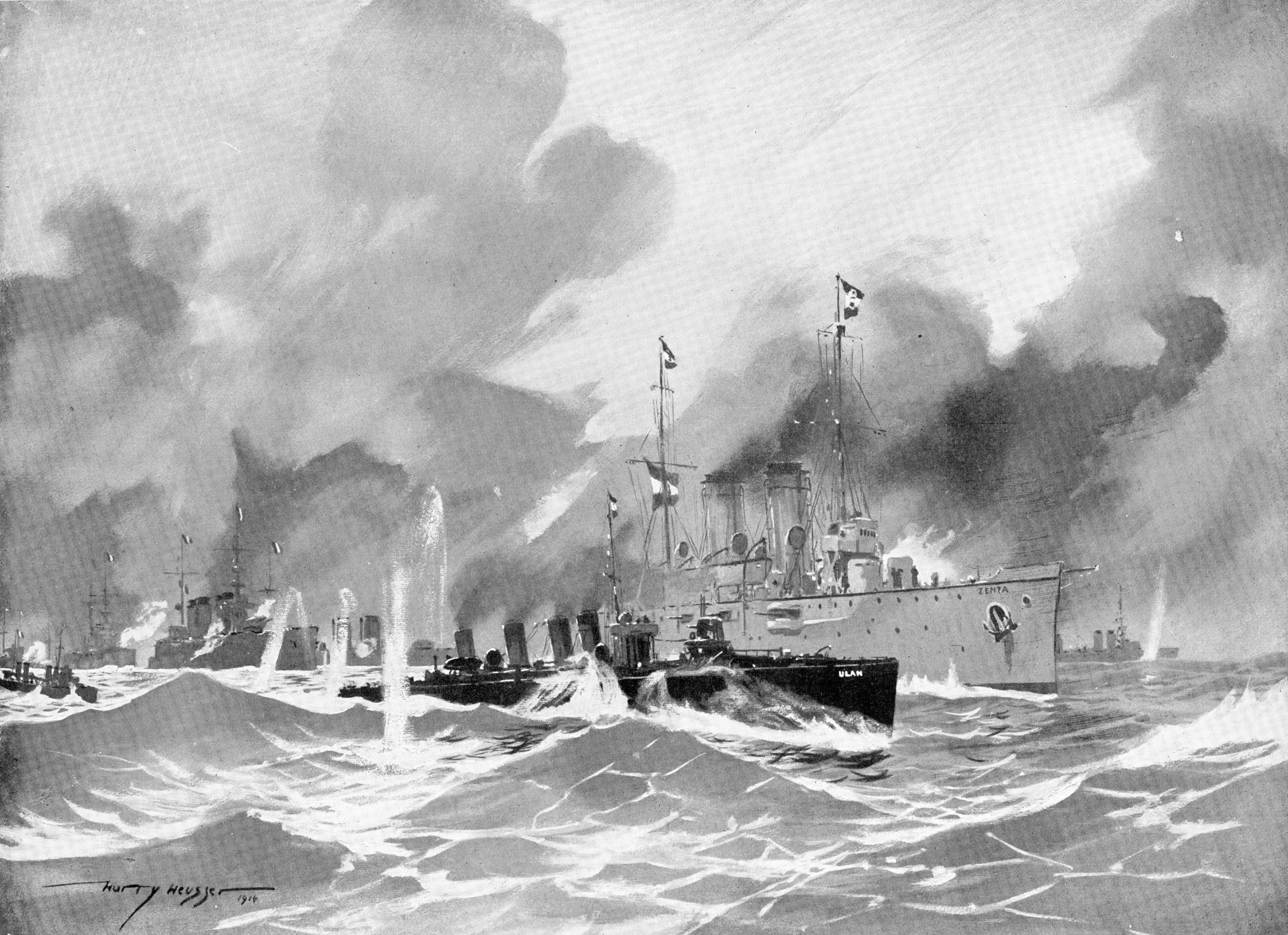
The Austro-Hungarian Zenta and Ulan under fire from the French fleet at the Battle of Antivari

On 12 August, France and Britain declared war on the Austro-Hungarian Empire as the war continued to widen. The 1st and 2nd Squadrons were therefore sent to the southern Adriatic Sea to contain the Austro-Hungarian Navy. On 15 August, the two squadrons arrived off the Strait of Otranto, where they met the patrolling British cruisers HMS Defence and HMS Weymouth north of Othonoi. Boué de Lapeyrère then took the fleet into the Adriatic in an attempt to force a battle with the Austro-Hungarian fleet; the following morning, the British and French cruisers spotted vessels in the distance that, on closing with them, turned out to be the protected cruiser SMS Zenta and the torpedo boat Ulan, which were trying to blockade the coast of Montenegro. In the ensuing Battle of Antivari, Boué de Lapeyrère initially ordered his battleships to fire warning shots, but this caused confusion among the fleet's gunners that allowed Ulan to escape. The slower Zenta attempted to evade, but she quickly received several hits that disabled her engines and set her on fire. She sank shortly thereafter and the Anglo-French fleet withdrew.

The French fleet patrolled the southern end of the Adriatic for the next three days with the expectation that the Austro-Hungarians would counterattack, but their opponent never arrived. On 20 August, the 1st Squadron was sent to replenish fuel at Malta while Patrie and Vérité remained on station; Justice, Démocratie, and République had had to withdraw as well, the first two ships having collided and République having taken Démocratie under tow. The French battleships then bombarded Austrian fortifications at Cattaro on 1 September in an attempt to draw out the Austro-Hungarian fleet, which again refused to take the bait. By this time, République and Justice had returned. On 18–19 September, the fleet made another incursion into the Adriatic, steaming as far north as the island of Lissa; on the return south, several French cruisers inadvertently came within range of the guns at Cattaro, so Patrie and Démocratie opened fire at the guns to suppress them while the cruisers withdrew.

The patrols continued through December, when an Austro-Hungarian U-boat torpedoed Jean Bart, leading to the decision by the French naval command to withdraw the main battle fleet from direct operations in the Adriatic. During this period, the French made Corfu their primary naval base in the area, with Malta serving as a support base where maintenance could be effected. On 21 January 1915, Patrie went to Prováti to rescue the crew from a Greek steamship that had run aground there. On 18 May, VA Nicol came aboard Patrie, making her his flagship; she then left 2nd Squadron for service with the Dardanelles Division as part of the Gallipoli Campaign. She steamed to the eastern Mediterranean with the armored cruiser Kléber and joined what became the 3rd Battle Division, which also included the battleships Suffren, Saint Louis, Charlemagne, Jauréguiberry, and Henri IV. On 12 July, Patrie supported an assault on the Ottoman forts at Achi Baba, firing several salvos with her secondary battery before returning to Mudros for the night. On 2 August, she steamed south to shell Seferihisar. During this action, a shell detonated in one of her secondary guns, wounding seven men.

==== 1916–1918 ====
Following the withdrawal from Gallipoli, the French transferred the ships of the erstwhile Dardanelles Division to Salonika, Greece. There, on 5 May 1916, Patrie and Vérité shot down a German zeppelin conducting reconnaissance in the area. By June, the French and British had grown weary over the refusal of the Greek King Constantine I to enter the war on the side of the Allies, so the French formed the 3rd Squadron, comprising the five République- and Liberté-class battleships and sent them to Salonika to put pressure on the Greek government. Over the course of June and July, the ships alternated between Salonika and Mudros, and on 9 July, Patrie was detached for an overhaul at Toulon. While she was away, the bulk of the French fleet was transferred to Cephalonia. Having arrived there after completing repairs by 1 September, the ship joined the 3rd Squadron on a patrol to Keratsini. From there, Patrie, Démocratie, and Suffren steamed to the roadstead off Eleusis just outside Athens on 7 October. There, the ships were to take part in an attack on the Greek fleet, with Patrie slated to engage the battleship Lemnos. But the plan was shelved and the French ultimately seized the Greek ships on 19 October.

In the meantime, in August, a pro-Allied group launched a coup against the monarchy in the Noemvriana, which the Allies sought to support. Patrie contributed men to a landing party that went ashore in Athens on 1 December support the coup. The British and French troops were defeated by the Greek Army and armed civilians and were forced to withdraw to their ships, after which the British and French fleet imposed a blockade of the royalist-controlled parts of the country. By June 1917, Constantine had been forced to abdicate and the 3rd Squadron was disbanded; Patrie and République became the Eastern Naval Division and were sent to the eastern Mediterranean. In December, both ships had their center and aft casemate guns removed. The ships spent 1917 largely idle as men were withdrawn from the fleet's battleships for use in anti-submarine warships. On 20 January 1918, the French received word that the battlecruiser Goeben (now under the Ottoman flag as Yavuz Sultan Selim) would sortie, so Patrie and République prepared for action. The battlecruiser struck several naval mines, however, and broke off the attack so the French ships remained in port.

On 4 July, Patrie went to Malta for periodic maintenance, which was completed four days later. She then returned to Mudros, by which time an influenza outbreak had killed eleven men and made another 475 seriously ill, 150 of whom had to be sent home to recover. Patrie was thereafter assigned to the Salonika Division, which was based in Mudros. The ship saw no further action for the remainder of the war, which concluded with the armistices signed with Germany, Austria-Hungary, and the Ottoman Empire in November.

=== Postwar career ===
Immediately after the end of the war, the French fleet began deploying to the Black Sea as part of the Allied intervention in the Russian Civil War. Patrie was sent to Constantinople in the Ottoman Empire, itself wracked with internal collapse and the Greco-Turkish War. Due to personnel shortages, Patrie was reduced to a barracks ship there. On 5 June 1919, she departed Constantinople and arrived in Toulon by way of Bizerte ten days later. She was assigned to the Training Division on 1 August as a replacement for the armored cruiser Victor Hugo. She was transferred to the school for torpedomen and electricians on 19 February 1921. During a gunnery drill on 20 May 1924, a shell exploded in her starboard forward secondary turret, killing eight and wounding five men. Another accident occurred on 3 June when one of the training torpedoes malfunctioned and circled back, striking Patrie and punching a hole in the hull. She was decommissioned on 20 June and repairs lasted from 15 August to 15 September. Patrie then became a stationary training ship at Saint-Mandrier-sur-Mer, serving in that role until 1936. She was ultimately sold to ship breakers on 25 September 1937 and scrapped.
