= Port of Bar =

Port of Bar Luka Bar
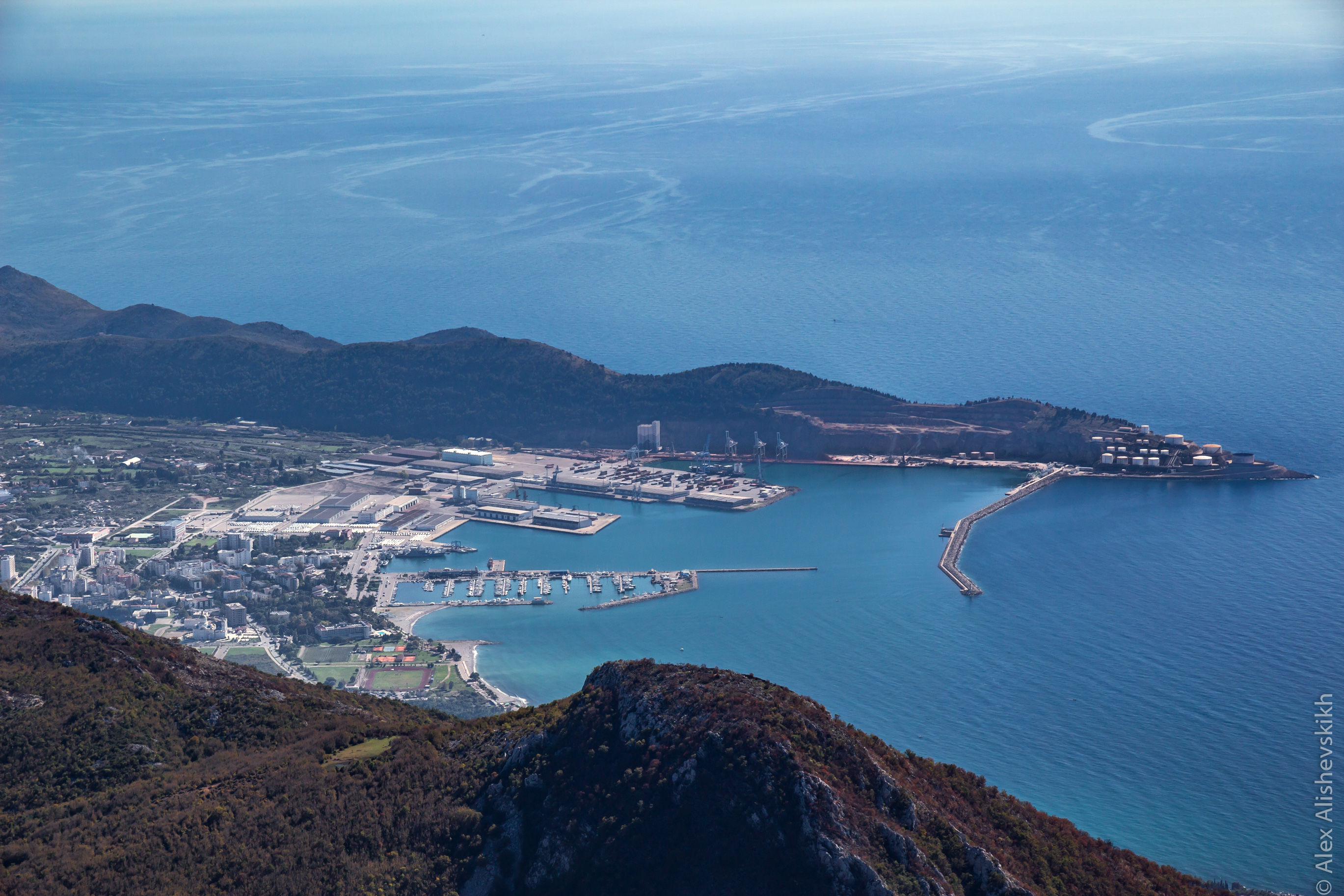
- Click on the map for a fullscreen view

Location
- Country: Montenegro
- Location: Bar

Details
- Opened: June 27, 1906
- Operated by: Global liman isletmeleri
- Employees: 409 (2021)
- Luka Bar a.d. chairman: Ilija Pješčić
- Kontejnerski Terminal i Generalni Tereti a.d. chairman: Andrija Radusinović

Statistics
- Vessel arrivals: 179 (2012)
- Annual cargo tonnage: 805.219 tonnes (2012)
- Annual revenue: 11 969 774 € (2021)
- Net income: 677 003 € (2021)
- Website www.lukabar.me

The Port of Bar (Montenegrin: Luka Bar, Лука Бар, MNSE: LUBA) is Montenegro's main sea port. It is located in Bar.

The EU believes that the Port of Bar is one of the essential elements of transport, and therefore the economy of Montenegro, with almost all overseas trade goods being carried through it.

== History ==
The Port of Bar was used as a sea port for Shkodër before it was conquered by the Turks in 1571. Right after the conquest of Bar, the Turks constructed a small port with one breakwater and wooden pier. This former Turkish port has been maintained and expanded since 1878, when Montenegro gained Bar after becoming officially independent from Ottoman Turkey. Montenegro became the first South Slavic state to have a port to the sea.

Construction of the port formally started on March 23, 1905, when King Nikola I, on board on the yacht Rumija, plunged a foundation stone, on which his initials and the date were carved in, into the sea. The Port of Bar officially began construction on June 27, 1906, even though the port was founded the same day. Coen Caglia, an Italian expert in maritime construction designed the port for an annual turnover of 3 million tons of cargo. Despite all the planning, only the 250 meter breakwater was constructed and put into operation on October 23, 1909.

During World War II, Germans mined and destroyed the port almost completely in 1944 while retreating. Reconstruction started in 1950, and the construction for a large port started four years later. The first phase was completed in 1965. The second phase that had in its plan an annual turnover of cca 5 million tons of cargo was almost completed, when the catastrophic earthquake struck in 1979, destroying more than half of its modern port facilities.

The reconstruction and renewal of the port's facilities started in 1981 and today's port of Bar, capable of handling cca 5 million tons of cargo, officially began operations on July 13, 1983.

According to an EU subsidy project document, it was noted in 2019 that Volujica quay had deteriorated and degraded rapidly in the previous several years. EU plans to improve connectivity include building a motorway Bar – Belgrade and the reconstruction and modernisation of the railway Bar – Belgrade.

Development plans at the port include an LNG terminal.

== Operations ==
The port management is split into two operators, ''Port of Bar'' JSC and JSC Container Terminal.

In 2022 the port was making a small profit on transhipping 2m tons p.a.

=== Terminals ===
- RO - RO Terminal
- Timber Terminal
- Container Terminal
- General Cargo Terminal
- Bulk Terminal
- Grain Terminal
- Liquid Cargo Terminal
- Passenger Terminal
