= Battle of Antivari =

1914 sea battle of World War I

- Part of the Mediterranean Theater of World War I
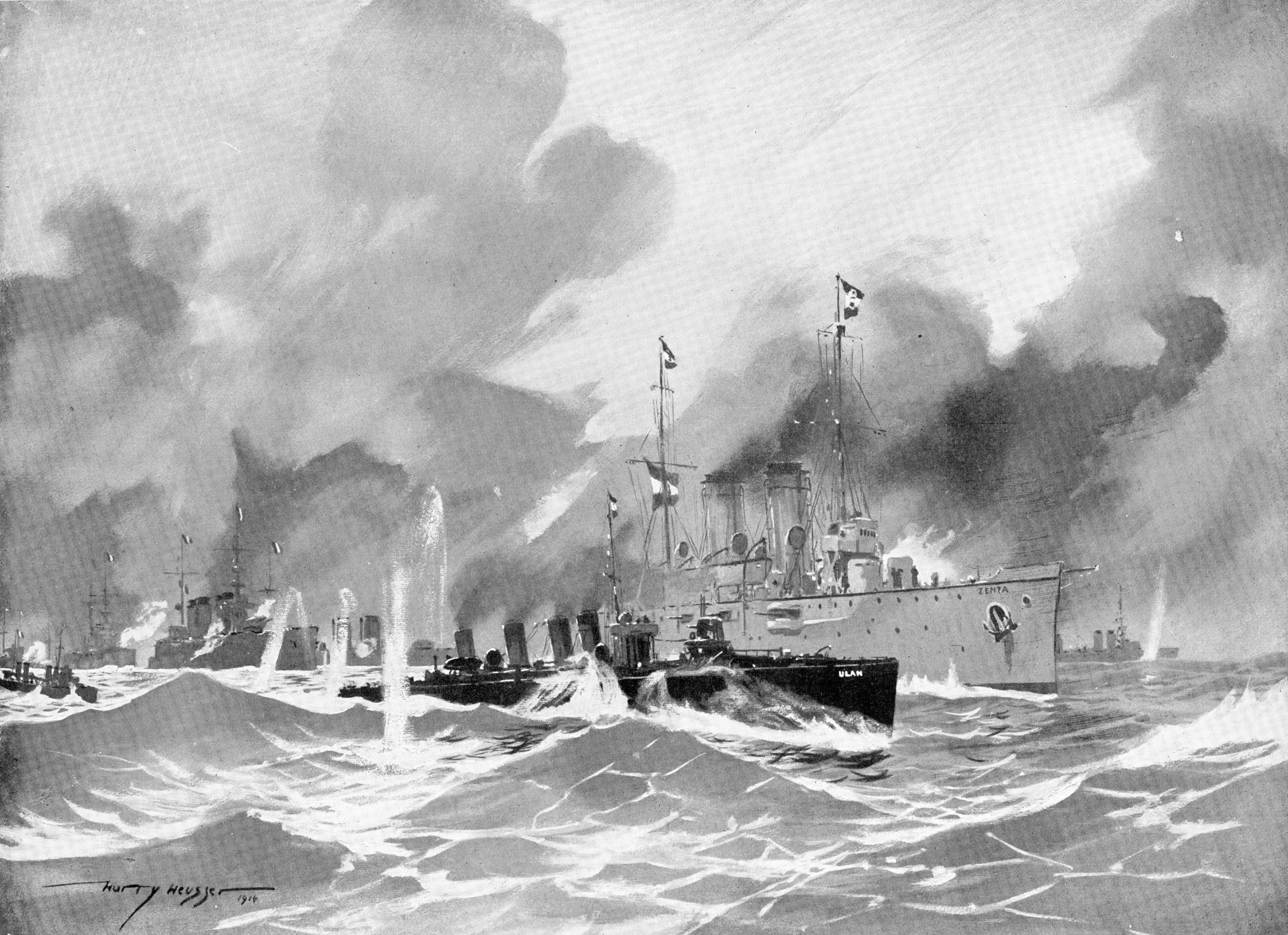
- Painting showing SMS Zenta and SMS Ulan in the Battle of Antivari
| Date | 16 August 1914 |
| Location | Off Antivari, Adriatic Sea 42°06′N 19°03′E |
| Result | Anglo-French victory |

Belligerents
| France; United Kingdom | Austria-Hungary |

Commanders and leaders
| Augustin Lapeyrère | Paul Pachner |

Strength
| 2 dreadnoughts 10 pre-dreadnoughts 6 armoured cruisers 1 protected cruiser 20+ destroyers | 1 protected cruiser 1 destroyer |

Casualties and losses
| 2 pre-dreadnoughts damaged 2 destroyers damaged | 173 killed 50+ wounded 1 destroyer damaged 1 protected cruiser sunk |

The Battle of Antivari or Action off Antivari was a naval engagement between a large fleet of French and British warships and two ships of the Austro-Hungarian navy at the start of the First World War. The old Austrian protected cruiser SMS Zenta and the destroyer SMS Ulan were blockading the Montenegrin port of Antivari, when on 16 August 1914, they were surprised and cut off by a large Anglo-French force that had sortied into the Adriatic. Zenta fought and was destroyed, to give Ulan a chance to escape, which she did. The ships of the Austrian fleet at Cattaro, unaware of events, did not come out of port to meet the Allied fleet. After blockading the Adriatic for a short while the French were forced to withdraw due to a lack of supplies.

== Background ==
When war broke out between the Austro-Hungarian Empire and Montenegro, the Austro-Hungarians began a blockade of the Montenegrin coast as well as several bombardments of various towns including the port of Antivari (today Bar), where the protected cruiser SMS Zenta and destroyer SMS Ulan were stationed. The French Navy had decided to try to force the Austro-Hungarian Navy into a decisive fleet action by making a sortie into the Adriatic and bait the Austrians into engaging them. The Allied force consisted of two dreadnought battleships, 10 pre-dreadnought battleships, four armoured cruisers, one protected cruiser and more than 20 destroyers. According to Austro-Hungarian naval records, the main force of the Austro-Hungarian fleet was unaware of the Allied presence until SMS Ulan radioed them as she escaped from the battle.

== Battle ==
The Allied fleet managed to cut off Zenta from the main Austro-Hungarian naval base at Cattaro. Badly outnumbered, Zenta's commander, Captain Paul Pachner, decided to fight to allow Ulan to escape. Zenta also had a serious disadvantage because her 120 mm guns were significantly outranged by the heavier guns on the Allied ships. The French battleships scored many hits on Zenta without suffering any damage. Zenta was sunk with 173 men killed and over 50 wounded but the sacrifice enabled Ulan to escape.

== Aftermath ==
Unaware of the situation outside Antivari until it was virtually over, that part of the Austro-Hungarian fleet stationed at Cattaro did not sortie to give battle as the French had hoped. French ships were not damaged by Austrian gunfire however 3 major guns exploded while firing, and the following day Justice, Démocratie, and two destroyers were damaged in a series of collisions. The action ended the Austro-Hungarian blockade of Montenegro which was a success for the Entente. The French fleet could not remain in the Adriatic for long and had to return to Malta periodically for supplies.

== Order of battle ==
=== French Navy ===
- Courbet, dreadnought battleship, flagship
- Jean Bart, dreadnought battleship
- 1st Battle squadron
  - Voltaire, pre-dreadnought battleship, Division Flagship
  - Vergniaud, pre-dreadnought battleship
  - Diderot, pre-dreadnought battleship, Squadron Flagship
  - Danton, pre-dreadnought battleship
  - Condorcet, pre-dreadnought battleship
- 2nd Battle squadron
  - Vérité, pre-dreadnought battleship, Squadron Flagship
  - Justice, pre-dreadnought battleship
  - Démocratie, pre-dreadnought battleship
  - Patrie, pre-dreadnought battleship, Division Flagship
  - République, pre-dreadnought battleship
- 1st Light Division
  - Ernest Renan, armoured cruiser
  - Edgar Quinet, armoured cruiser
- 2nd Light Division
  - Victor Hugo, armoured cruiser
  - Jules Ferry, armoured cruiser
- Jurien de la Gravière, protected cruiser
- 3 Destroyer Squadrons

=== Royal Navy ===
- HMS Warrior, armoured cruiser
- HMS Defence, armoured cruiser
- 4 Destroyers

=== Austro-Hungarian Navy ===
- Blockade Force
  - SMS Zenta, protected cruiser
  - SMS Ulan, destroyer
- Auxiliary Force
  - SMS Monarch (1895)
  - SMS Panther (1885)
  - 2 Destroyers
