= Paul Pachner =

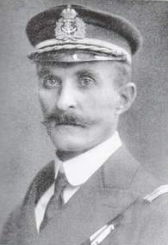
- Native name: Pavel Pačner
- Born: October 17, 1871; Marburg, Austria-Hungary
- Died: October 13, 1937 (aged 65); Maribor, Yugoslavia
- Rank: Counter admiral

Paul Pachner (October 17, 1871 - October 13,1937) was an Austro–Hungarian admiral who served during World War I. He commanded the protected cruiser SMS Zenta during the Battle of Antivari in 1914, where it was sunk in an unequal battle with a large French fleet. After the war, he served in the Spanish merchant marine, then aboard the Khedive of Egypt's private yacht, and finally aboard a Yugoslav collier.
