= Rumija (ship) =

Ship

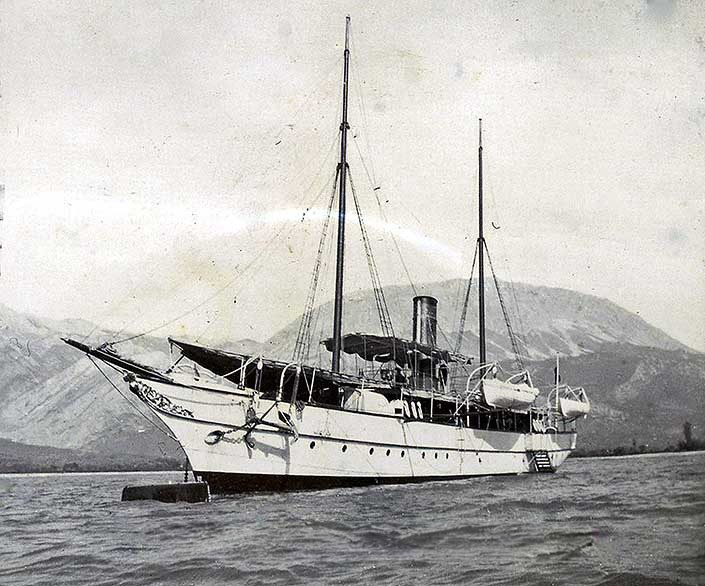
- Rumija

History

Principality/Kingdom of Montenegro
- Name: Rumija
- Namesake: The Rumija mountains
- Ordered: Sultan Abdul Hamid II?
- Commissioned: 3 January 1905
- Fate: Sunk by Austria-Hungary on 2 March 1915

General characteristics
- Type: steam yacht
- Length: 47.78 metres

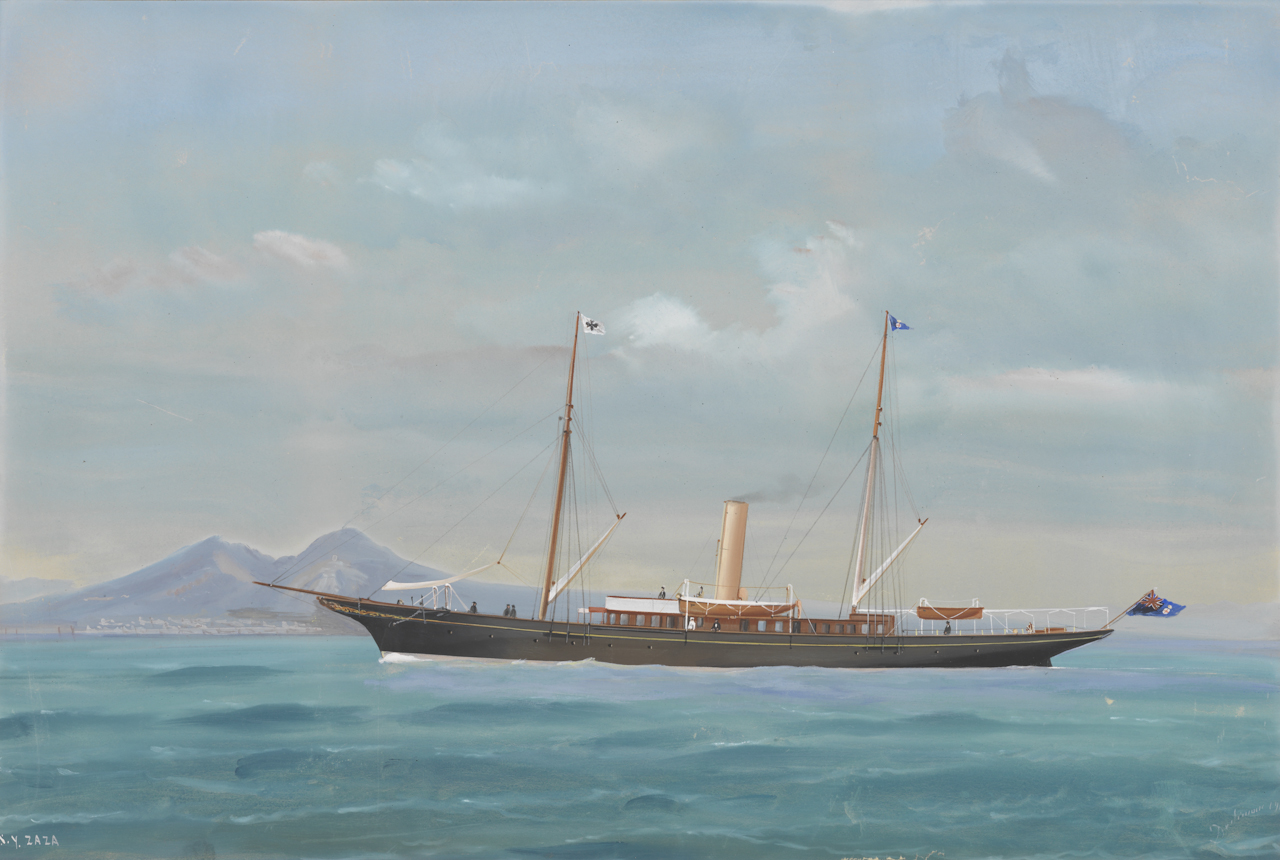
S.Y. Zaza

Rumija was a steam yacht that served the Montenegrin navy from 1905 to 1915. It had two masts, and was 47.78 metres long and 6.10 metres wide.

Rumija was purchased in England by the Ottoman Turks and carried the name Zaza. In January 1905, Turkish Sultan Abdul Hamid II gifted the yacht to Prince Nicholas I of Montenegro. The yacht, sailing under Turkish sailors, arrived at Pristan on 1 January 1905 to be taken over by the Montenegrin crew two days later, on 3 January. Two days later, loaded with 15 tonnes of coal, the prince's new yacht set sail for the Bay of Kotor and it cast anchor in Meljine. During the first few months, Zaza was used to transport the royal family from the Bay to Albania.

On 23 March 1905, Prince Nicholas, while on board Zaza, held a ceremony which formally commenced the construction of the Port of Bar.

Montenegrin Crown Prince Daniel, while taking a cruise down the Bojana River on 28 July 1908, had decided to rename Zaza Rumija. The name Rumija may have been chosen in part because the Rumija mountain range is located near the Bojana River.

== World War I and demise ==
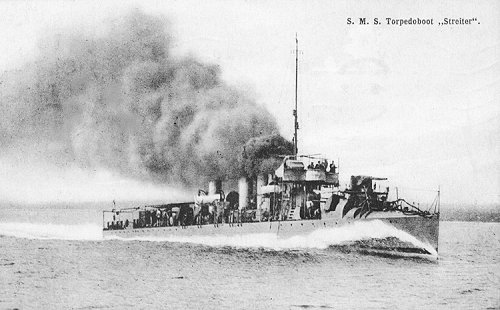
Austro-Hungarian torpedo boat Streiter

During World War I, the ship was used to transport military forces and arms. Because of the few risks involved, the Austro-Hungarian forces decided to take action into their own hands, following the ship in pursuit for several days with airplanes, submarines and torpedo boats. Finally, on 2 March 1915, near Pristan, two out of five Austro-Hungarian torpedo boats broke off the ship's anchor chain, pulling the ship to the breakwater. This in turn was followed by a series of torpedoes directed toward the ship. The ship is reported to have sunk at 3:45 that morning.

== Crew ==
The yacht's crew included fourteen men operating the ship. Throughout its course, the yacht has had two captains:

- Captain Niko Janković (3 January 1905 – 14 January 1912)
- Captain Ivo Ðokić (14 January 1912 – 2 March 1915)

Its machinists included Labud Nut (1905), Stefan Ingriz (1910) and Ivan Richter (1913).
