= French battleship Charlemagne =

French Navy's Charlemagne class pre-dreadnought battleship

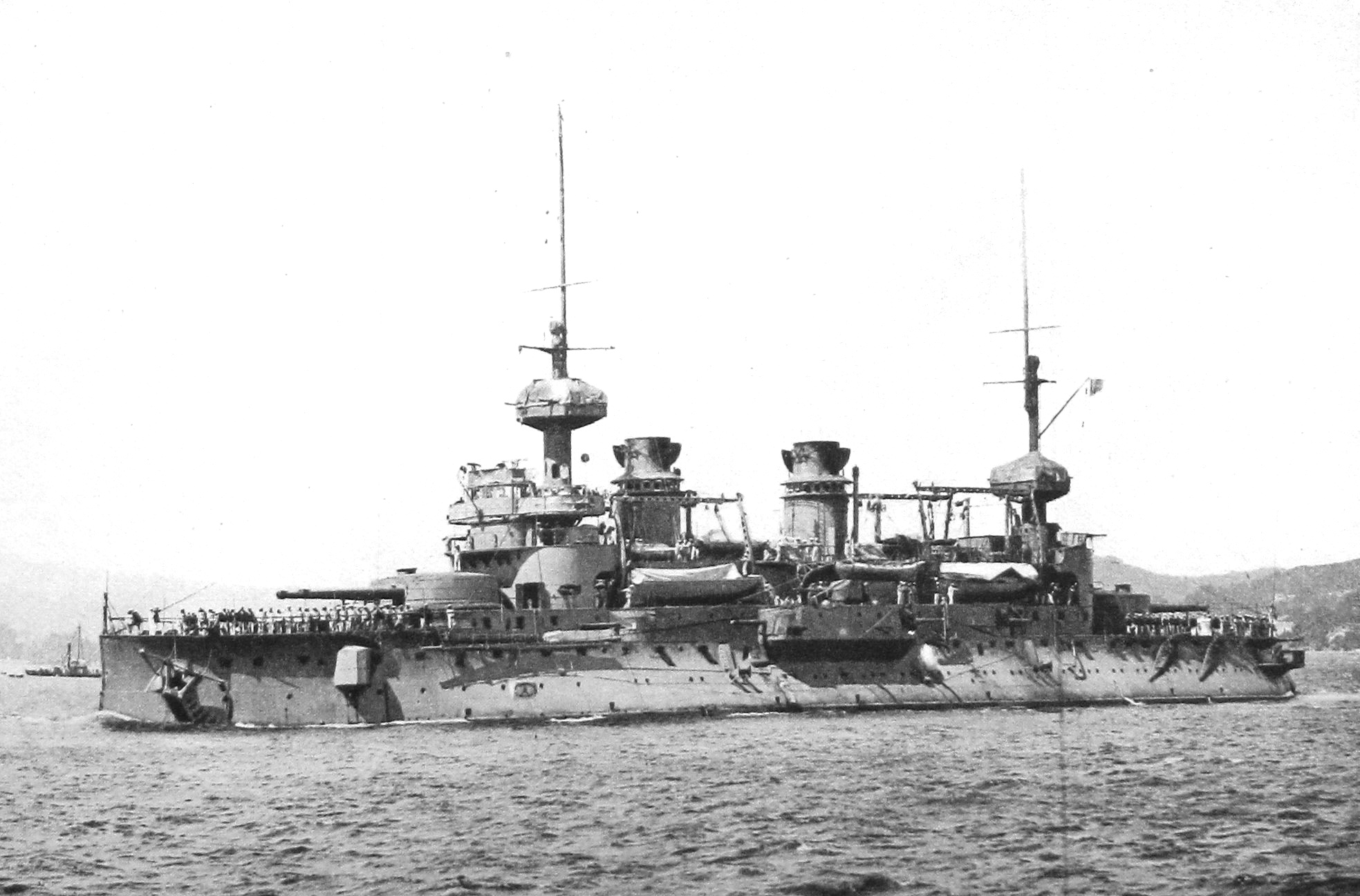
- Charlemagne at anchor

History

France
- Name: Charlemagne
- Namesake: Charlemagne
- Ordered: 30 September 1893
- Builder: Arsenal de Brest
- Laid down: 2 August 1894
- Launched: 17 October 1895
- Completed: 12 September 1897
- Commissioned: 12 September 1899
- Decommissioned: 1 November 1917
- Stricken: 21 June 1920
- Fate: Sold for scrap, 1923

General characteristics
- Class & type: Charlemagne-class battleship
- Displacement: 11,415 t (11,235 long tons) (normal load)
- Length: 117.7 m (386 ft 2 in)
- Beam: 20.3 m (66 ft 7 in)
- Draught: 8.4 m (27 ft 7 in)
- Installed power: 20 Belleville boilers; 14,200 PS (10,400 kW)
- Propulsion: 3 shafts, 3 triple-expansion steam engines
- Speed: 18 knots (33 km/h; 21 mph)
- Range: 4,000 miles (3,480 nmi) at 10 knots (19 km/h; 12 mph)
- Complement: 692
- Armament: 2 × twin 305 mm (12 in) guns; 10 × single 138.6 mm (5.46 in) guns; 8 × single 100 mm (3.9 in) guns; 20 × single 47 mm (1.9 in) guns; 4 × 450 mm (17.7 in) torpedo tubes
- Armour: Belt: 110–400 mm (4.3–15.7 in); Decks: 70 mm (2.8 in); Barbettes: 270 mm (10.6 in); Turrets: 320 mm (12.6 in)

Charlemagne was a predreadnought battleship built for the French Navy in the mid-1890s, the name ship of her class. Completed in 1899, she spent the bulk of her career in the Mediterranean Sea. The battleship was initially assigned to the Northern Squadron (Escadre du Nord), but was not transferred to the Mediterranean Squadron (Escadre de la Méditerranée) until 1900. Twice the ship participated in the occupation of the port of Mytilene on the island of Lesbos, then owned by the Ottoman Empire, once as part of a French expedition and another as part of an international squadron. Charlemagne and her sister ships rejoined the Northern Squadron in 1909 and the obsolete battleship became a gunnery training ship in 1913.

When World War I began in August 1914, she escorted Allied troop convoys in the Mediterranean for the first three months. Charlemagne was ordered to the Dardanelles in November to guard against a sortie into the Mediterranean by the ex-German, Ottoman battlecruiser Yavuz Sultan Selim. In 1915, she joined British ships in bombarding Ottoman fortifications. The ship was transferred later that year to the squadron assigned to prevent any interference by the Greeks with Allied operations on the Salonica front. Charlemagne briefly served as a flagship before she was converted into a depot ship in mid-1917 and was partially disarmed later that year. The ship was stricken from the naval register in 1918. Charlemagne was condemned in 1920 and later sold for scrap in 1923.

== Design and description ==
The Charlemagne-class ships were authorized in the 1892 Naval Program as smaller versions of the preceding Bouvet, albeit with an improved armament. They were 117.7 metres (386 ft 2 in) long overall and had a maximum beam of 20.3 metres (66 ft 7 in). At deep load, the ships had a draught of 7.4 metres (24 ft 3 in) forward and 8.4 metres (27 ft 7 in) aft. Their designed displacement was 11,287 tonnes (11,109 long tons), but they were overweight and displaced 11,415 tonnes (11,235 long tons) at normal load. When serving as flagships, their crew numbered 750 men, but had 32 officers and 660 ratings as private ships. The ships were powered by three vertical triple-expansion steam engines, each driving one shaft using steam generated by 20 Belleville boilers. These boilers were coal-burning with auxiliary oil sprayers and were designed to produce 14,200 metric horsepower (10,444 kW; 14,006 ihp) to give the Charlemagne class a speed of 17 knots (31 km/h; 20 mph). During her sea trials, Charlemagne reached a top speed of 18.1 knots (33.5 km/h; 20.8 mph) during her sea trials on 15 June 1898, although her main armament had not yet been installed. The ships carried enough coal to give them a range of 4,000 nautical miles (7,400 km; 4,600 mi) at a speed of 10 knots (19 km/h; 12 mph).

The Charlemagnes carried their main battery of four Canon de 305 mm (12 in) Modèle 1893 guns in two twin-gun turrets, one each fore and aft of the superstructure. Their secondary armament consisted of ten Canon de 138.6 mm (5.5 in) Modèle 1893 guns, eight of which were mounted in individual casemates and the remaining pair in shielded mounts on the forecastle deck amidships. They also carried eight Canon de 100 mm (3.9 in) Modèle 1893 guns in open mounts on the superstructure. The ships' anti-torpedo boat defences consisted of twenty Canon de 47 mm (1.9 in) Modèle 1885 and two 37 mm (1.5 in) Maxim guns, fitted in platforms on both masts, on the superstructure, and in casemates in the hull. The ships mounted four 450-millimetre (17.7 in) torpedo tubes, two on each broadside, one submerged and the other above water. As was common with ships of her generation, they were built with a plough-shaped ram.

The Charlemagne-class ships had a complete waterline belt of nickel-steel armour that ranged in thickness from 300 to 400 mm (11.8 to 15.7 in) and was thickest amidships. The armour plates were 2 m (6 ft 7 in) high with the upper 0.5 m (1 ft 8 in) above the design waterline and they tapered to a maximum thickness of 150 mm (5.9 in) at their bottom edges. The thicknesses of the bottom edges of the plates gradually reduced to 134 mm (5.3 in) at the bow and 110 mm (4.3 in) at the stern. The gun turrets were protected by 320 mm (12.6 in) of Harvey armour and their barbettes had 270-millimetre (10.6 in) plates of the same type of armour. The main armoured deck of extra mild steel was 70 mm (2.8 in) thick and there was a 40-millimetre-thick (1.6 in) splinter deck below it. The conning tower had a 326-millimetre-thick (12.8 in) face and 276 mm (10.9 in) sides.

== Construction and career ==
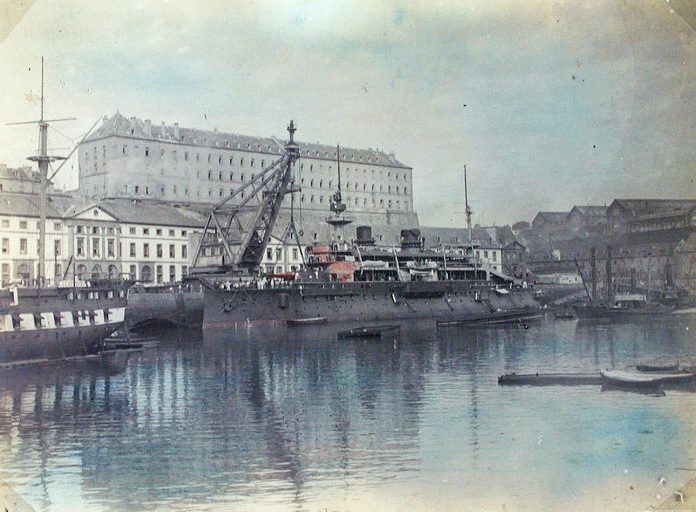
Charlemagne fitting out in Brest, 1898

Charlemagne was the namesake of the first Holy Roman Emperor, and was ordered on 30 September 1893 as the name ship of the three battleships of her class. With an initial budget of 24,000,000 French francs, the ship was laid down at the Arsenal de Brest on 2 August 1894, launched on 17 October 1895 and completed on 12 September 1899. Construction was delayed by the late delivery of her main gun turrets. Charlemagne was initially assigned to the Northern Squadron, but, together with her sister Gaulois, she was transferred to the 1st Battleship Division of the Mediterranean Squadron in January 1900. On 18 July, after combined manoeuvres with the Northern Squadron, the ship participated in a naval review conducted by the President of France, Émile Loubet, at Cherbourg. She escorted Louis André, the Minister of War and Jean de Lanessan, the Minister of Marine on their tours of Corsica and French Tunisia later in October. While passing through the Bizerte Canal, she damaged a propeller and it was repaired in November. The following year, Charlemagne and the Mediterranean Squadron participated in an international naval review by President Loubet in Toulon with ships from Spain, Italy and Russia.

In October 1901, the 1st Battleship Division (1^{re} Division cuirassée), comprising Charlemagne and her sisters Gaulois and Saint Louis, under the command of Rear Admiral (contre-amiral) Leonce Caillard, was ordered to proceed to the port of Mytilene on the island of Lesbos, then owned by the Ottoman Empire. After landing two companies of marines that occupied the major ports of the island on 7 November, Sultan Abdul Hamid II agreed to enforce contracts made with French companies and to repay loans made by French banks. The 1st Division departed Lesbos in early December and returned to Toulon. In January–March 1902, Charlemagne was deployed in Moroccan waters and participated in the summer fleet exercises later that year. At the end of January 1903, the division conducted gunnery training off Golfe-Juan. Naval historians Paul Silverstone and Eric Gille claim that the ship collided with Gaulois on 2 March 1903, but was not damaged. (Note: This is not mentioned in naval historian Phillippe Caresse's detailed history of Gaulois.) The battleships of the Mediterranean Squadron visited Cartagena, Spain, in June and then Palma de Mallorca and Ibiza in the Balearic Islands in October.

On 24 February 1904, Charlemagne was transferred to the 2nd Battle Division. She was one of the ships that escorted President Loubet during his state visit to Italy in April and participated in the annual fleet manoeuvers later that summer. While ammunition was being transferred on 30 December 1904, an explosion occurred in a 305 mm magazine, but Charlemagne suffered neither casualties nor damage from the incident as the magazine was quickly flooded. Together with the destroyer Dard, the ship was the French contribution to an international squadron that briefly occupied Mytilene in November–December 1905 and participated in a naval review by President Armand Fallières in September of the following year. Charlemagne, Saint Louis, and the predreadnought battleship Suffren were deployed to Morocco on 30 November to reduce tensions between the European powers vying to assume control over that country. Their presence was effective and they returned to Toulon before the end of the year. She engaged in the summer naval manoeuvres in 1907 and 1908 and was transferred to the 4th Battle Division with her sisters when that unit was formed in July 1908.

The 4th Division had been reassigned to the newly formed 2nd Battle Squadron (Escadre de ligne) by 5 January 1909. The Mediterranean and Northern Squadrons were redesignated as the 1st and 2nd Squadrons respectively on 5 October 1909. The division spent Christmas at Mers El Kébir, French Algeria, and made port visits to Cádiz, Spain, Lisbon, Portugal, and Quiberon enroute to Brest where they arrived on 27 February 1910 and their new assignment to the 2nd Squadron. The divisions of the battle squadrons had been renumbered on 5 January and the 4th Division became the 1st Division of the 2nd Battle Squadron. On 1 August 1911 the 2nd Battle Squadron was renumbered as the 3rd Battle Squadron and the ships participated in a large naval review by President Fallières off Toulon on 4 September. Charlemagne was placed in reserve in Brest in September 1912 to begin a lengthy overhaul; the ship rolled 34° during her post-overhaul sea trials on 30 May 1913 which raised serious questions about her stability and that of her sisters. She returned to the Mediterranean in July and was relegated to serve as a gunnery training ship from 23 July until the beginning of World War I a year later.

=== World War I ===
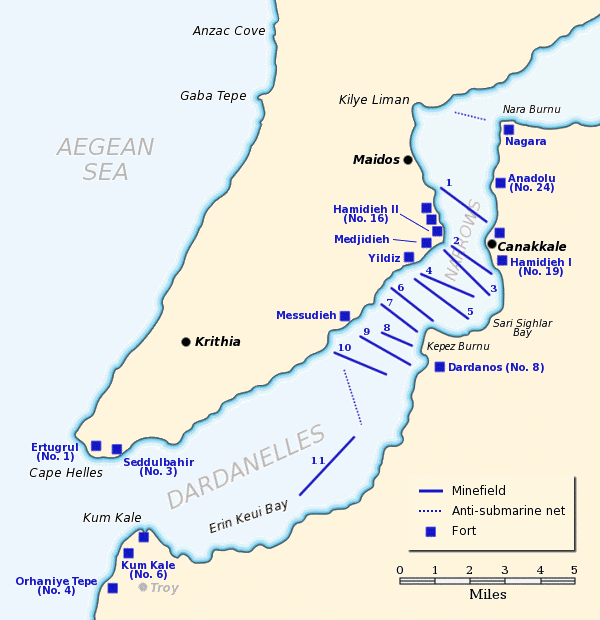
Turkish defenses of the Dardanelles, February–March 1915

Charlemagne was not initially combat ready and arrived at Bizerte on 19 August and was joined there by Saint Louis and Suffren three days later. They were tasked with patrolling merchant traffic between Tunis and Sicily to prevent contraband shipments to the Central Powers. In October, the British requested assistance in escorting two large troop convoys through the Mediterranean in October and Charlemagne was one of the ships deployed to Port Said, Egypt, in mid-October to do so. Together with Saint Louis, Charlemagne was transferred to the Dardanelles Division (Division de Dardanelles) and joined Gaulois in the Aegean Sea on 26 November to guard against a sortie by Yavuz Sultan Selim. During the bombardment of Ottoman fortifications on 25 February 1915, Charlemagne engaged the fort at Kum Kale with some effect. The ship provided support for British battleships on 1 March as they bombarded Kilitbahir Castle; she was straddled several times by return fire, but was not damaged.

On 18 March, Charlemagne, together with Bouvet, Suffren, and Gaulois, was tasked to penetrate deep into the Dardanelles after six British battleships suppressed the defending Ottoman fortifications and attack those same fortifications at close range. After the French ships were ordered to be relieved by six other British battleships, Bouvet struck a mine and sank almost instantly while Gaulois was hit twice, one of which opened a large hole in her hull that began to flood the ship. Charlemagne escorted Gaulois to the Rabbit Islands, north of Tenedos, where the latter ship could be beached for temporary repairs. Together with two British predreadnought battleships and the Russian protected cruiser Askold, Charlemagne bombarded Ottoman fortifications defending the Gulf of Saros on 26 March. The battleship arrived at Bizerte on 3 April to begin a badly needed refit that included repairs to her rudder. The same day that Charlemagne returned to the Dardanelles, the Dardanelles Division was redesignated as the Dardanelles Squadron (Escadre des Dardanelles) on 14 May and the battleships were assigned to the 3rd Battleship Division shortly afterwards. Together with the British predreadnought battleship HMS Agamemnon, she bombarded Ottoman positions during the Third attack on Anzac Cove on 19–22 May. Charlemagne was slightly damaged when her armour belt was dented when she was struck by a shell on 25 May. The ship bombarded Ottoman fortifications at Achi Baba on 30 May without noticeable effect and Kumkale on 5–6 June. During the Landing at Suvla Bay, Charlemagne bombarded Ottoman positions on 5–6 August.

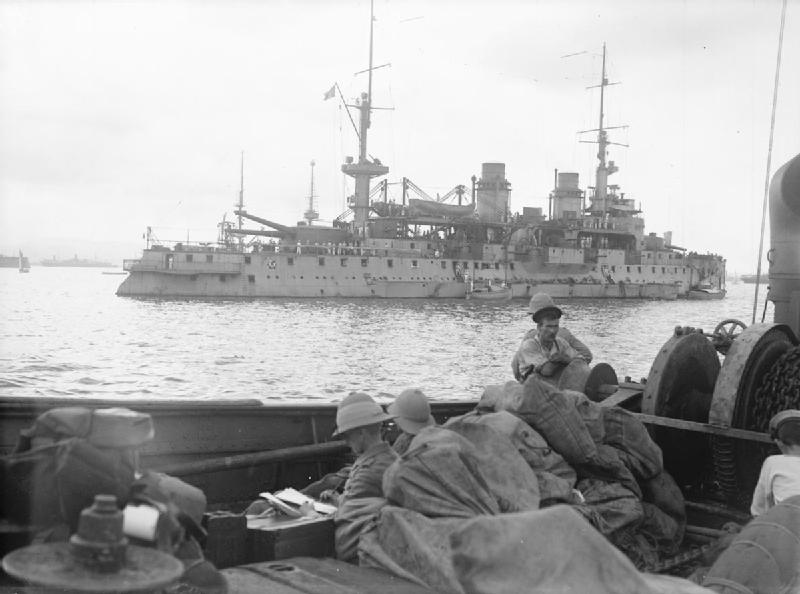
Charlemagne anchored in Moudros harbour, 1915

The ship was transferred to Salonica in October 1915 where she joined the French squadron assigned to prevent any interference by the Greeks with Allied operations in Greece. Charlemagne was escorted by the destroyers Hussard and Massue from Salonica to Bizerte on 20–24 April 1916 to begin a refit. She returned to Salonica on 5 August and was assigned to the Division of the Naval Bases of the Eastern Army (Division des bases navales du corps expéditionnaire d'Orient). The ship became the flagship of Rear Admiral Henri Salaün, commander of the Division of the Naval Bases, on 24 February. Charlemagne was scheduled to receive modifications to improve her stability early in 1917, but this was cancelled. Salaün transferred his flag to the predreadnought Patrie on 18 August as Charlemagne was in the process of leaving Greek waters. The ship continued onwards to Bizerte where she arrived on 20 August. She was scheduled to begin a refit there, but the navy decided to transfer the work to Toulon on 31 August. Escorted by the destroyers Carabinier, Arquebuse, Fronde, Aspirant Herber and Mortier, Charlemagne arrived there on 17 September. Due to a shortage of coal, the navy decided to cancel the refit two days later and convert her into a depot ship for propellant and explosives. Her 138.6 mm guns were removed the following month and three ventilators were removed in January 1918 for use on other ships.

The ship was decommissioned on 1 November 1917 and was stricken from the naval register on 14 March 1918 with the proviso that her propulsion plant was required to remain operational. Charlemagne was condemned on 21 June 1920 and turned over as part payment to the company that was scrapping the wreck of the predreadnought Liberté. They sold her to an Italian company that demolished her in Savona, Italy.

== Bibliography ==
- Caresse, Philippe (2012). "The Battleship Gaulois". In John, Jordan (ed.). Warship 2012. London: Conway. ISBN 978-1-84486-156-9.
- Corbett, Julian (1997). Naval Operations. History of the Great War: Based on Official Documents. Vol. II (reprint of the 1929 second ed.). London; Nashville, Tennessee: Imperial War Museum in association with the Battery Press. ISBN 978-1-870423-74-8.
- Gille, Eric (1999). Cent ans de cuirassés français [A Century of French Battleships] (in French). Nantes: Marines édition. ISBN 2-909-675-50-5.
- Jordan, John & Caresse, Philippe (2017). French Battleships of World War One. Annapolis, Maryland: Naval Institute Press. ISBN 978-1-59114-639-1.
- Lange-Akhund, Nadine (1998). The Macedonian Question, 1893-1908, from Western Sources. East European Monographs. Vol. CDLXXXVI. Boulder, Colorado: East European Monographs. ISBN 978-0-88033-383-2.
- Le Chuiton (1925). La division navale des bases du corps expeditionnaire d'Orient et de l'Armée d'Orient : 25 août 1915-3 mars 1916 (in French). Ecole de Guerre Navale.
- Prévoteaux, Gérard (2017). La marine française dans la Grande guerre: les combattants oubliés: Tome I 1914–1915 [The French Navy during the Great War: The Forgotten Combatants, Book I 1914–1915]. Collection Navires & Histoire des Marines du Mond (in French). Vol. 23. Le Vigen, France: Éditions Lela presse. ISBN 978-2-37468-000-2.
- Roberts, Stephen S. (2021). French Warships in the Age of Steam 1859–1914: Design, Construction, Careers and Fates. Barnsley, UK: Seaforth Publishing. ISBN 978-1-5267-4533-0.
- Silverstone, Paul H. (1984). Directory of the World's Capital Ships. New York: Hippocrene Books. ISBN 0-88254-979-0.
