= Spahi-class destroyer =

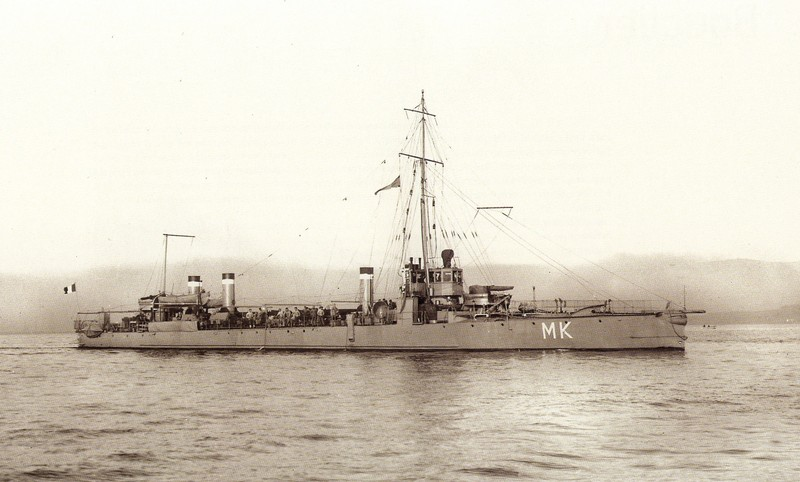
- Mameluck at anchor

Class overview
- Name: Spahi class
- Operators: French Navy
- Preceded by: Claymore class
- Succeeded by: Voltigeur class
- Built: 1906–1912
- In service: 1910–1930
- Completed: 7
- Lost: 1
- Scrapped: 6

General characteristics
- Type: Destroyer
- Displacement: 530–550 t (522–541 long tons)
- Length: 64–65.8 m (210 ft 0 in – 215 ft 11 in) (p/p)
- Beam: 6.05–6.6 m (19 ft 10 in – 21 ft 8 in)
- Draft: 2.3–2.4 m (7 ft 7 in – 7 ft 10 in)
- Installed power: 4 water-tube boilers; 7,500–9,000 indicated horsepower (5,593–6,711 kW)
- Propulsion: 2 shafts; 2 triple-expansion steam engines
- Speed: 28 knots (52 km/h; 32 mph)
- Range: 1,000–1,200 nmi (1,900–2,200 km; 1,200–1,400 mi) at 10 knots (19 km/h; 12 mph)
- Complement: 77–79
- Armament: 6 × single 65 mm (2.6 in) gun; 3 × single 450 mm (17.7 in) torpedo tubes

The Spahi class consisted of seven destroyers built for the French Navy in the first decade of the 20th century. One ship was lost during the First World War, but the others survived to be scrapped afterwards.

== Design and description ==
The Spahi-class was over 50 percent larger than the preceding Branlebas class to match the increase in size of foreign destroyers. They varied slightly in size due to building practices of each shipyard. They had a length between perpendiculars of 64–65.8 meters (210 ft 0 in – 215 ft 11 in), a beam of 6.05–6.6 meters (19 ft 10 in – 21 ft 8 in), and a draft of 2.3–2.4 meters (7 ft 7 in – 7 ft 10 in). The ships displaced 530–550 metric tons (522–541 long tons) at deep load.

The destroyers were powered by two triple-expansion steam engines, each driving one propeller shaft using steam provided by four water-tube boilers of three different types. Spahi and Lansquenet used Normand boilers, Hussard and Mameluck had du Temple boilers while the remaining three ships were fitted with Guyot boilers. The engines were designed to produce 7,500 indicated horsepower (5,600 kW), except for Spahi with 9,000 ihp (6,700 kW), which was intended to give the sister ships a speed of 28 knots (52 km/h; 32 mph). During their sea trials, they reached speeds of 27.1–29.8 knots (50.2–55.2 km/h; 31.2–34.3 mph). The ships carried 95 t (93 long tons) of coal which gave them a range of 1,000–1,200 nautical miles (1,900–2,200 km; 1,200–1,400 mi) at a cruising speed of 10 knots (19 km/h; 12 mph). Lansquenet had a capacity of 115 t (113 long tons) which gave her a range of 2,880 nmi (5,330 km; 3,310 mi) at the same cruising speed.

The primary armament of the Spahi-class ships consisted of six 65-millimeter (2.6 in) Modèle 1902 guns in single mounts, one each fore and aft of the superstructure and the others were distributed amidships. They were also fitted with three 450-millimeter (17.7 in) torpedo tubes. One of these was in a fixed mount in the bow and the other two were on single rotating mounts amidships.

== Ships ==
Name	Builder	Laid down	Launched	Completed	Fate
Aspirant Herber	Arsenal de Rochefort		30 April 1912	August 1912	Condemned, July 1930
Carabinier	Ateliers et Chantiers de Saint-Nazaire Penhoët, Saint-Nazaire		10 October 1908	October 1909	Scuttled, 15 November 1918
Enseigne Henry	Arsenal de Rochefort		12 May 1911	April 1912	Condemned, June 1928
Hussard	Ateliers et Chantiers de la Loire, Nantes		12 September 1908	September 1911	Condemned, March 1922
Lansquenet	Dyle et Bacalan, Bordeaux		20 November 1908	October 1910	Condemned, December 1928
Mameluck	Ateliers et Chantiers de la Loire, Nantes		10 March 1909	June 1911	Condemned, February 1928
Spahi	Forges et Chantiers de la Méditerranée, La Seyne-sur-Mer		3 May 1908	July 1910	Condemned, December 1927

== Bibliography ==
- Couhat, Jean Labayle (1974). French Warships of World War I. London: Ian Allan. ISBN 0-7110-0445-5.
- Gardiner, Robert & Gray, Randal (1985). Conway's All The World's Fighting Ships 1906–1921. London: Conway Maritime Press. ISBN 0-85177-245-5.
- Jordan, John (2026). "The French 450-Tonne Destroyers". In Jordan, John (ed.). Warship 2026. Osprey Publishing. pp. 111–128. ISBN 978-1-4728-7259-3.
- Osborne, Eric W. (2005). Destroyers - An Illustrated History of Their Impact. Santa Barbara, California: ABC-Clio. ISBN 1-85109-479-2.
- Prévoteaux, Gérard (2017). La marine française dans la Grande guerre: les combattants oubliés: Tome I 1914–1915 [The French Navy during the Great War: The Forgotten Combatants, Book I 1914–1915]. Collection Navires & Histoire des Marines du Mond. Vol. 23. Le Vigen, France: Éditions Lela presse. ISBN 978-2-37468-000-2.
- Prévoteaux, Gérard (2017). La marine française dans la Grande guerre: les combattants oubliés: Tome II 1916–1918 [The French Navy during the Great War: The Forgotten Combatants, Book II 1916–1918]. Collection Navires & Histoire des Marines du Mond. Vol. 27. Le Vigen, France: Éditions Lela presse. ISBN 978-2-37468-001-9.
- Roberts, Stephen S. (2021). French Warships in the Age of Steam 1859–1914: Design, Construction, Careers and Fates. Barnsley, UK: Seaforth Publishing. ISBN 978-1-5267-4533-0.
- Roche, Jean-Michel (2005). "Classement par types". Dictionnaire des bâtiments de la flotte de guerre française de Colbert à nos jours 2, 1870 - 2006. Toulon: Roche. ISBN 978-2-9525917-0-6. OCLC 165892922.
