= French destroyer Lansquenet (1909) =

Destroyer of the French Navy

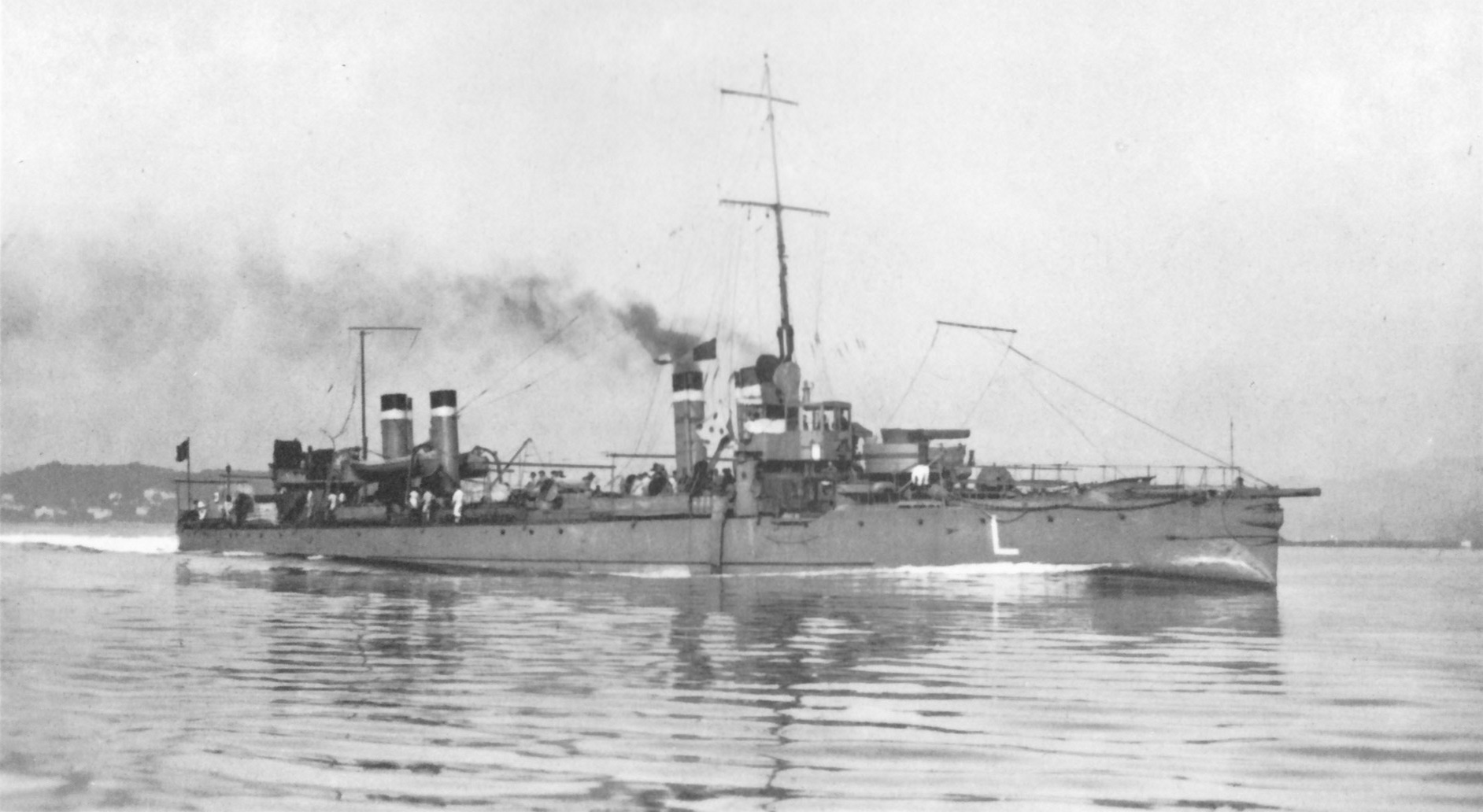
- Lansquenet in 1910

History

France
- Name: Lansquenet
- Namesake: Landsknecht
- Builder: Dyle et Bacalan, Bordeaux
- Launched: 20 November 1909
- Completed: October 1910
- Stricken: December 1928

General characteristics
- Class & type: Spahi-class destroyer
- Displacement: 530–550 t (522–541 long tons)
- Length: 64 m (210 ft 0 in) (p/p)
- Beam: 6.6 m (21 ft 8 in)
- Draft: 2.3 m (7 ft 7 in)
- Installed power: 7,500 ihp (5,593 kW); 4 Normand boilers
- Propulsion: 2 shafts; 2 triple-expansion steam engines
- Speed: 28 knots (52 km/h; 32 mph)
- Range: 2,880 nmi (5,330 km; 3,310 mi) at 10 knots (19 km/h; 12 mph)
- Complement: 77–79
- Armament: 6 × single 65 mm (2.6 in) gun; 3 × 450 mm (17.7 in) torpedo tubes

Lansquenet was one of seven Spahi-class destroyers built for the French Navy in the first decade of the 20th century.

== Design and description ==
The Spahi-class was over 50 percent larger than the preceding Branlebas class to match the increase in size of foreign destroyers. Lansquenet had a length between perpendiculars of 64 meters (210 ft), a beam of 6.6 meters (21 ft 8 in), and a draft of 2.3 meters (7 ft 7 in). The ships displaced 530–550 metric tons (522–541 long tons) at deep load. Their crew numbered 77–79 officers and men.

Lansquenet was powered by two triple-expansion steam engines, each driving one propeller shaft using steam provided by four Normand boilers. The engines were designed to produce 7,500 indicated horsepower (5,600 kW) which was intended to give the Spahi class a speed of 28 knots (52 km/h; 32 mph). During her sea trials, Lansquenet reached a speed of 28.84 knots (53.41 km/h; 33.19 mph). She carried more coal than her sister ships which gave her a range of 2,880 nautical miles (5,330 km; 3,310 mi) at a cruising speed of 10 knots (19 km/h; 12 mph).

The primary armament of the Spahi-class ships consisted of six 65-millimeter (2.6 in) Modèle 1902 guns in single mounts, one each fore and aft of the superstructure and the others were distributed amidships. They were also fitted with three 450-millimeter (17.7 in) torpedo tubes. One of these was in a fixed mount in the bow and the other two were on single rotating mounts amidships.

== Construction and career ==
Lansquenet was ordered from Dyle et Bacalan and was launched at their shipyard in Bordeaux on 20 November 1909. She was completed in October 1910. When the First World War began in August 1914, Lansquenet was assigned to the 2nd Destroyer Flotilla (2^{e} escadrille de torpilleurs) of the 1st Naval Army (1^{ère} Armée Navale). During the preliminary stages of the Battle of Antivari, Montenegro, on 16 August, the 1st, 4th and 5th Destroyer Flotillas were tasked to escort the core of the 1st Naval Army while the 2nd, 3rd and 6th Flotillas escorted the armored cruisers of the 2nd Light Squadron (2^{e} escadre légère) and two British cruisers. After reuniting both groups and spotting the Austro-Hungarian protected cruiser SMS Zenta and the destroyer SMS Ulan, the French destroyers played no role in sinking the cruiser, although the 4th Flotilla was sent on an unsuccessful pursuit of Ulan. Having broken the Austro-Hungarian blockade of Antivari (now known as Bar), Vice-Admiral (Vice-amiral) Augustin Boué de Lapeyrère, commander of the 1st Naval Army, decided to ferry troops and supplies to the port, escorted by the 2nd Light Squadron and the 1st and 6th Destroyer Flotillas while the rest of the 1st Naval Army bombarded the Austro-Hungarian naval base at Cattaro, Montenegro, on 1 September. Four days later, the fleet covered the evacuation of Danilo, Crown Prince of Montenegro to the Greek island of Corfu. The 2nd Flotilla bombarded Stončica Lighthouse on the island of Lissa on 19 September. The flotilla escorted multiple small convoys loaded with supplies and equipment to Antivari, beginning in October and lasting for the rest of the year, always covered by the larger ships of the Naval Army in futile attempts to lure the Austro-Hungarian fleet into battle. The Naval Army raided Lissa and the island of Lastovo on 2 November with Lansquenet entering Vis harbor and extorting a ransom from the townsmen lest the French bombard the town. As they departed, the French shelled the lighthouse again.

The torpedoing of the French battleship Jean Bart on 21 December caused a change in French tactics as the battleships were too important to risk to submarine attack. Henceforth, only the destroyers would escort the transports, covered by cruisers at a distance of 20–50 miles (32–80 km) from the transports. The first convoy of 1915 to Antivari arrived on 11 January and more were made until the last one on 20–21 April. After Italy signed the Treaty of London and declared war on the Austro-Hungarian Empire on 23 May, the ship was still assigned to the 2nd Flotilla when the unit was transferred to the 1st Division of Destroyers and Submarines (1^{ère} division de torpilleurs et de sous-marines) of the 2nd Squadron (escadre) based at Brindisi, Italy.

== Bibliography ==
- Couhat, Jean Labayle (1974). French Warships of World War I. London: Ian Allan. ISBN 0-7110-0445-5.
- Freivogel, Zvonimir (2019). The Great War in the Adriatic Sea 1914–1918. Zagreb: Despot Infinitus. ISBN 978-953-8218-40-8.
- Prévoteaux, Gérard (2017). La marine française dans la Grande guerre: les combattants oubliés: Tome I 1914–1915 [The French Navy during the Great War: The Forgotten Combatants, Book I 1914–1915]. Collection Navires & Histoire des Marines du Mond. Vol. 23. Le Vigen, France: Éditions Lela presse. ISBN 978-2-37468-000-2.
- Prévoteaux, Gérard (2017). La marine française dans la Grande guerre: les combattants oubliés: Tome II 1916–1918 [The French Navy during the Great War: The Forgotten Combatants, Book II 1916–1918]. Collection Navires & Histoire des Marines du Mond. Vol. 27. Le Vigen, France: Éditions Lela presse. ISBN 978-2-37468-001-9.
- Roberts, Stephen S. (2021). French Warships in the Age of Steam 1859–1914: Design, Construction, Careers and Fates. Barnsley, UK: Seaforth Publishing. ISBN 978-1-5267-4533-0.
- Smigielski, Adam (1985). "France". In Gray, Randal (ed.). Conway's All the World's Fighting Ships 1906–1921. Annapolis, Maryland: Naval Institute Press. pp. 190–220. ISBN 0-87021-907-3.
