= French destroyer Lansquenet =

At least two ships of the French Navy have been named Lansquenet:

- French destroyer Lansquenet (1909), a Spahi-class destroyer launched in 1909 and struck in 1928
- French destroyer Lansquenet (1939), a Le Hardi-class destroyer launched in 1939 and scuttled in 1942
