= Augustin Boué de Lapeyrère =

French admiral

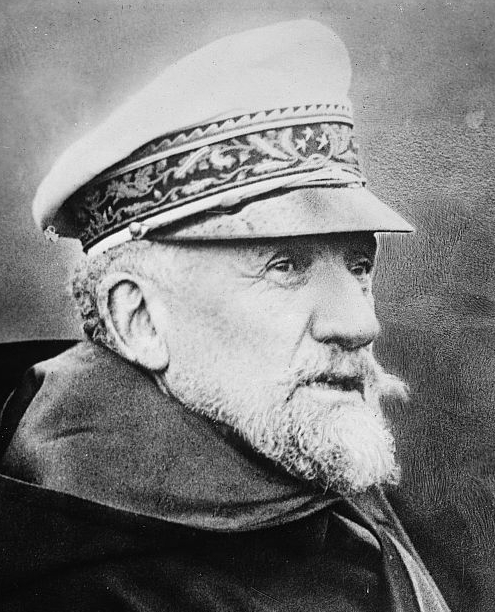
Augustin Boué de Lapeyrère

Augustin Manuel Hubert Gaston Boué de Lapeyrère (18 January 1852 – 17 February 1924) was a French admiral during World War I. He was a strong proponent of naval reform, and is comparable to Admiral Jackie Fisher of the British Royal Navy.

== Biography ==
Boué de Lapeyrère was born in Castéra-Lectourois, Gers into a family of sailors: his uncle was vice-admiral Augustin Dupouy, who becomes his mentor following the death of his father. He entered the École Navale in 1869. He took part in the Tonkin campaign during the Sino-French war and showed himself to be a leader of men and tactician, especially at the Battle of Fuzhou. Made rear-admiral in 1902, he became major general in Rochefort, where he had as aide-de-camp Pierre Loti (1902-1904), then commander-in-chief of the Atlantic naval division from 1904 to 1906. He was promoted vice-admiral in 1908 and became maritime prefect for Brest (préfet maritime).

Boué de Lapeyrère served as Minister of Marine, a political position, from 24 July 1909 until 27 February 1911 in the governments of Aristide Briand. While in this position he championed the production of large capital ships, deferring the production of submarines and anti-submarine warships in favor of larger vessels. He reorganized the service and constructed many ships, in particular the Courbet-class dreadnoughts. He also founded the naval air service.

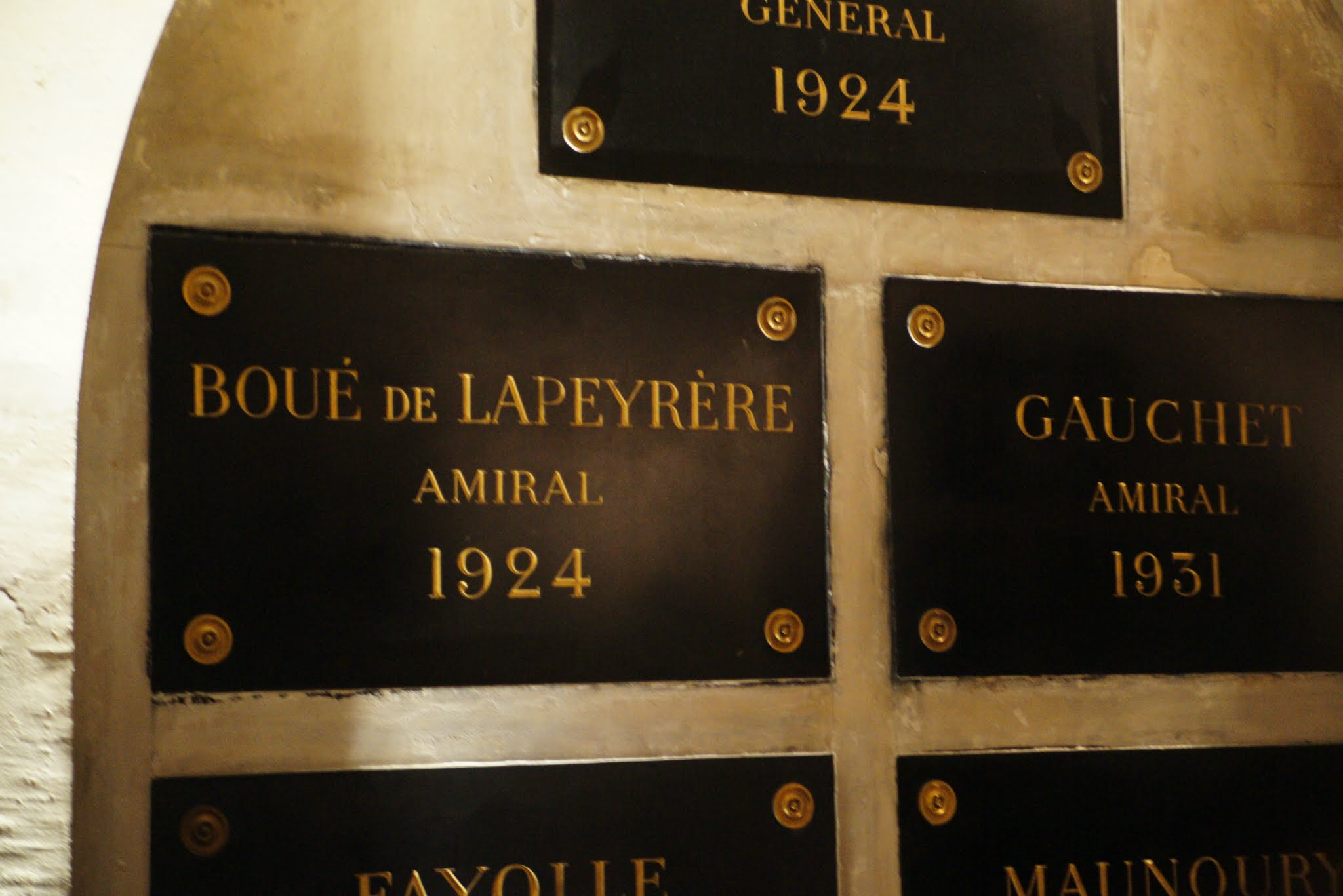
8th arcade of the crypt: Caveau des Gouverneurs, under the Eglise de Saint-Louis des Invalides

Upon retiring from the office of Minister of Marine, Boué de Lapeyrère was appointed Commander-in-Chief of France's Mediterranean forces in anticipation of sea battles in the Mediterranean between the allies and the navies of Italy and Austria-Hungary and was made Commander in chief of the allied Mediterranean navies. However, these large battles did not materialize, and fighting in the Mediterranean remained limited to raids by submarines and light craft of the Austro-Hungarian navy. (Italy remained neutral until it joined the Allies in 1915, and hence posed no threat to France.) Boué de Lapeyrère thus found his main duty as commander-in-chief to be policing the sea lanes to protect allied shipping. He was criticised at the start of the war in August 1914 for his part in the escape of the German ships Goeben and Breslau from the Mediterranean to form a Turkish navy in the Black Sea. He then attacked isolated Austro-Hungarian naval units at the Battle of Antivari in an attempt to entice the Austro-Hungarians into a fleet action. Despite Lapeyrere's squadron destroying Austro-Hungarian cruiser SMS Zenta, the Austro-Hungarian navy did not sortie and no general fleet action occurred.

Despite his notable successes (such as bombarding Cattaro and occupying the Dalmatian Islands), the sinking of the armoured cruiser Léon Gambetta, torpedoed by Austro-Hungarian submarine U-5, elicited his resignation on 10 October 1915 without any public explanation. He was replaced by Admiral Dartige du Fournet. Placed in the reserve in 1916, he retired to Lectoure. He was granted the Grand Cross of the Légion d'honneur in April 1921. Admiral Boué de Lapeyrère lived until 1924, when he died at the age of 72, in Pau. His body was transferred to Les Invalides in Paris, France in 1931, he is buried in the 8th arcade of the crypt: Caveau des Gouverneurs, located under the Eglise de Saint-Louis des Invalides.
