= List of ship launches in 1908 =

The list of ship launches in 1908 includes a chronological list of some ships launched in 1908.

Date	Ship	Class / type	Builder	Location	Country	Notes
4 January	Papin	Pluviôse-class submarine	Arsenal de Rochefort	Rochefort	France	For French Navy
22 January	Hornby	Tugboat	John Cran & Co.	Leith	United Kingdom	
23 January	Memphian	Cargo ship	Harland & Wolff	Belfast	United Kingdom	For F. Leyland & Co.
6 February	Saphir	Émeraude-class submarine	Arsenal de Toulon	Toulon	France	For French Navy
15 February	Hache	Claymore-class destroyer	Toulon Dockyard	Toulon	France	
26 February	Senator Schröder	Fishing trawler	Eider werke AG	Tönning	Germany	For Cuxhavener Hochseefischerei AG
3 March	Rathmore	Passenger steamer	Vickers	Barrow-in-Furness	United Kingdom	For London and North Western Railway
3 March	Rotterdam	Passenger ship	Harland & Wolff	Belfast	United Kingdom	For Holland America Line.
7 March	Nassau	Nassau-class battleship	Kaiserliche Werft	Wilhelmshaven	Germany	
18 March	Seneca	Revenue cutter	Newport News Shipbuilding	Newport News, Virginia	United States	
23 March	Ben-my-Chree	Passenger steamer	Vickers	Barrow-in-Furness	United Kingdom	For Isle of Man Steam Packet Company
25 March	Mogami	Yodo-class cruiser	Mitsubishi Heavy Industries	Nagasaki	Japan	
31 March	Hilary	Passenger/Mail liner	Caledon Shipbuilding & Engineering Company	Dundee	United Kingdom	For Booth Steamship Company
31 March	Verona	Passenger liner	Workman, Clark & Co	Belfast	United Kingdom	
11 April	Blücher	Unique armored cruiser	Kaiserliche Werft	Kiel	Germany	
14 April	Odland	Cargo ship	Sunderland Shipbuilding Co Ltd	Sunderland	United Kingdom	
16 April	Mercian	Cargo ship	Harland & Wolff	Belfast	United Kingdom	For Furness Leyland Line.
18 April	Floréal	Pluviôse-class submarine	Arsenal de Cherbourg	Cherbourg	France	For French Navy
30 April	Föhr-Amrum	ferry	Howaldtswerke-Deutsche Werft	Kiel	Germany	For Wyker Dampfschiffs-Reederei Amrum GmbH
5 May	Amalfi	Pisa-class cruiser	Cantieri navali Odero	Sestri Ponente	Italy	
14 May	Boadicea	Boadicea-class cruiser	Pembroke Dockyard	Pembrokeshire, Wales	United Kingdom	
19 May	Vestal	Collier	Brooklyn Navy Yard	Brooklyn, New York	United States	
26 May	Michigan	South Carolina-class battleship	New York Shipbuilding	Camden, New Jersey	United States	
26 May	Emden	Dresden-class cruiser	Kaiserliche Werft	Danzig	Germany	
May	Alexandra	steamboat	Janssen & Schmilinsky	Hamburg	Germany	For Vereinigte Flensburg-Ekensunder und Sonderburger Dampfschiffsgesellschaft
16 June	Fresnel	Pluviôse-class submarine	Arsenal de Rochefort	Rochefort	France	For French Navy
27 June	Lapland	Ocean liner	Harland and Wolff	Belfast, County Antrim	United Kingdom	For Red Star Line
1 July	Westfalen	Nassau-class battleship	AG Weser	Bremen	Germany	
2 July	Topaze	Émeraude-class submarine	Arsenal de Toulon	Toulon	France	For French Navy
11 July	South Carolina	South Carolina-class battleship	William Cramp & Sons	Philadelphia, Pennsylvania	United States	
15n July	Sir Walter Scott	Cargo ship	Blyth Shipbuilding & Dry Docks Co. Ltd	Blyth	United Kingdom	For Sir Walter Scott Steamship Co. Ltd.
3 August	Turquoise	Émeraude-class submarine	Arsenal de Toulon	Toulon	France	For French Navy
13 August	Léopoldville	Passenger ship	Harland & Wolff	Belfast	United Kingdom	For Compagnie Belge Maritime du Congo.
8 September	Erzherzog Franz Ferdinand	Radetzky-class battleship	Stabilimento Tecnico Triestino	Trieste	Austria-Hungary	For Austro-Hungarian Navy
10 September	Laurentic	Passenger ship	Harland & Wolff	Belfast	United Kingdom	For White Star Line.
10 September	Minas Geraes	Minas Geraes-class battleship	Armstrong Whitworth	Newcastle upon Tyne, England	United Kingdom	For Brazilian Navy
10 September	St Vincent	St Vincent-class battleship	HM Dockyard	Portsmouth	United Kingdom	
19 September	Massue	Claymore-class destroyer	Toulon Dockyard	Toulon	France	
26 September	Rheinland	Nassau-class battleship	AG Vulcan	Stettin	Germany	
26 September	Prairial	Pluviôse-class submarine	Arsenal de Cherbourg	Cherbourg	France	For French Navy
29 September	Duca d'Aosta	Ocean liner	Cantieri Navale Siciliani	Palermo	Italy	For Navigazione Generale Italiana
26 October	Werribee	Cargo ship	Blyth Shipbuilding & Dry Docks Co. Ltd	Blyth	United Kingdom	For Huddart Parker & Co. Pty. Ltd.
7 November	Collingwood	St Vincent-class battleship	Devonport Dockyard	Devonport, England	United Kingdom	
7 November	Harvey Scott	Cargo ship	Blyth Shipbuilding & Dry Docks Co. Ltd	Blyth	United Kingdom	For Harvey Scott Steamship Co. Ltd.
10 November	North Dakota	Delaware-class battleship	Fore River Shipyard	Quincy, Massachusetts	United States	
10 November	George Washington	Ocean liner	AG Vulcan	Stettin	Germany	For North German Lloyd
12 November	Minnewaska	Passenger ship	Harland & Wolff	Belfast	United Kingdom	For Atlantic Transport Co.
14 November	Kolberg	Kolberg-class cruiser	Schichau-Werke	Danzig	Germany	For Imperial German Navy
5 December	Ontario	Collier	Mare Island Naval Shipyard	Vallejo, California	United States	
10 December	Megantic	Passenger ship	Harland & Wolff	Belfast	United Kingdom	For White Star Line.
12 December	Posen	Nassau-class battleship	Friedrich Krupp Germaniawerft	Kiel	Germany	
24 December	Messidor	Pluviôse-class submarine	Arsenal de Cherbourg	Cherbourg	France	For French Navy
31 December	Monge	Pluviôse-class submarine	Arsenal de Toulon	Toulon	France	For French Navy
Unknown date	Bono	Steam drifter	Beeching Brothers Ltd.	Great Yarmouth	United Kingdom	For William Holker.
Unknown date	Bournemouth Queen	Paddle steamer	Ailsa Shipbuilding Co Ltd.	Troon	United Kingdom	For P. & A. Campbell.
Unknown date	Ever Ready	Sloop	Brown & Clapson	Barton-upon-Humber	United Kingdom	For William Stamp.
Unknown date	Girl Rhoda	Steam drifter	Beeching Brothers Ltd.	Great Yarmouth	United Kingdom	For Richard Sutton.
Unknown date	Gladys & Rose	Steam drifter	Beeching Brothers Ltd.	Great Yarmouth	United Kingdom	For Thomas Moore.
Unknown date	J.C.P.	Steam drifter	Beeching Brothers Ltd.	Great Yarmouth	United Kingdom	For Pitchers Ltd.
Unknown date	Laura	Coaster	Kjøbenhavns Flydedok & Skibsværft	Copenhagen	Denmark	For A/S Dampskibs Selskap Vesterhavet
Unknown date	Lerwick	Steam drifter	Beeching Brothers Ltd.	Great Yarmouth	United Kingdom	For John H. Waite.
Unknown date	Mary Ann	Lighter	Brown & Clapson	Barton-upon-Humber	United Kingdom	For private owner.
Unknown date	Mispah	Sloop	Brown & Clapson	Barton-upon-Humber	United Kingdom	For Walter Oldridge.
Unknown date	Morea	Ocean liner	Barclay, Curle & Co. Ltd.	Glasgow	United Kingdom	For Peninsular and Oriental Steam Navigation Company.
Unknown date	Ottar	Cargo ship	Fevigs Jernskibbyg	Fevig	Norway	For private owner.
Unknown date	Tainui	Cargo ship	Workman, Clarke & Co. Ltd.	Belfast	United Kingdom	For Shaw, Savill & Albion Ltd.
