= List of ship launches in 1909 =

The list of ship launches in 1909 includes a chronological list of some ships launched in 1909.

Date	Ship	Class	Builder	Location	Country	Notes
16 January	Voltaire	Danton-class battleship	FCM	La Seyne	France	For French Navy
20 January	Bahia	Bahia-class cruiser	Armstrong Whitworth	Elswick	United Kingdom	For Brazilian Navy
23 January	Mainz	Kolberg-class cruiser	AG Vulcan	Stettin	Germany	For Imperial German Navy
6 February	Delaware	Delaware-class battleship	Newport News Shipbuilding	Newport News, Virginia	United States	For United States Navy
6 February	Espagne	Cargo ship	Chantiers Navals Anversois S.A	Hoboken, Antwerp	Belgium	For Armement Adolf Deppe
24 February	B.H.C. No. 9	Hopper barge	Blyth Shipbuilding & Dry Docks Co. Ltd	Blyth	United Kingdom	For Blyth Harbour Commissioners.
24 February	B.H.C. No. 10	Hopper barge	Blyth Shipbuilding & Dry Docks Co. Ltd	Blyth	United Kingdom	For Blyth Harbour Commissioners.
9 March	Karoola	Passenger ship	Harland & Wolff	Belfast	United Kingdom	For McIlwraith, McEacharn & Co.
15 March	De Zeven Provinciën	Coastal defence ship	Rijkswerf	Amsterdam	Netherlands	For Royal Netherlands Navy
20 March	Von der Tann	Unique battlecruiser	Blohm & Voss	Hamburg	Germany	For Imperial German Navy
20 March	Crusader	Tribal-class destroyer	J. Samuel White	Cowes	United Kingdom	For Royal Navy.
25 March	Mallina	Cargo ship	Harland and Wolff	Belfast	United Kingdom	For Australian United Steam Navigation Company
6 April	Almirante Lobo	Transport	Scott of Kinghorn	Kinghorn	United Kingdom	For Spanish Navy
19 April	São Paulo	Minas Geraes-class battleship	Vickers	Barrow-in-Furness	United Kingdom	For Brazilian Navy
19 April	Diderot	Danton-class battleship	Ateliers et Chantiers de la Loire	Saint-Nazaire	France	For French Navy
20 April	Condorcet	Danton-class battleship	Ateliers et Chantiers de la Loire	Saint-Nazaire	France	For French Navy
21 April	Nubian	Tribal-class destroyer	John I. Thornycroft & Company	Woolston, Southampton	United Kingdom	For Royal Navy.
22 April	Vanguard	St Vincent-class battleship	Vickers	Barrow-in-Furness	United Kingdom	For Royal Navy
6 May	Berbice	Cargo ship	Harland & Wolff	Belfast	United Kingdom	For Royal Mail Line.
8 May	May Scott	Cargo ship	Blyth Shipbuilding & Dry Docks Co. Ltd	Blyth	United Kingdom	For May Scott Steamship Co. Ltd.
12 May	B.H.C. No. 11	Hopper barge	Blyth Shipbuilding & Dry Docks Co. Ltd	Blyth	United Kingdom	For Blyth Harbour Commissioners.
18 May	Berthelot	Pluviôse-class submarine	Arsenal de Rochefort	Rochefort	France	For French Navy
24 May	Maori	Tribal-class destroyer	William Denny and Brothers	Dumbarton	United Kingdom	For Royal Navy.
3 June	Constantine	Coaster	Blyth Shipbuilding & Dry Docks Co. Ltd	Blyth	United Kingdom	For Screw Collier Co. Ltd.
3 June	Leicestershire	Passenger ship	Harland & Wolff	Belfast	United Kingdom	For Bibby Steamship Co.
5 June	Cöln	Kolberg-class cruiser	Germaniawerft	Kiel	Germany	For Imperial German Navy
18 June	Watt	Pluviôse-class submarine	Arsenal de Rochefort	Rochefort	France	For French Navy
3 July	Radetzky	Radetzky-class battleship	Stabilimento Tecnico Triestino	Trieste	Austria-Hungary	For Austro-Hungarian Navy
3 July	Thermidor	Submarine	Arsenal de Cherbourg	Cherbourg	France	For French Navy
4 July	Danton	Danton-class battleship	Arsenal de Brest	Brest	France	For French Navy
8 July	Meltonian	Cargo ship	Harland & Wolff	Belfast	United Kingdom	For Furness Leyland Line.
8 July	Woodmere	Coaster	Blyth Shipbuilding & Dry Docks Co. Ltd	Blyth	United Kingdom	For Grasmere Steamship Co. Ltd.
10 July	Augsburg	Kolberg-class cruiser	Kaiserliche Werft	Kiel	Germany	For Imperial German Navy
31 July	Toreador	Cargo Ship	Bremer Vulcan	Bremen-Vegesack	Germany	For J. D. Stücken
4 August	Archimède	Submarine	Arsenal de Cherbourg	Cherbourg	France	For French Navy
14 August	Iserlohn	Cargo ship	Reiherstieg Schiffswerfte & Maschinenfabrik	Hamburg	Germany	For Deutsche-Australische Dampfschiffs Gesellschaft
September	Answald	Merchant	Blohm & Voss	Bremen-Vegesack	Germany	Converted as a seaplane carrier in World War I
14 September	Viking	Tribal-class destroyer	Palmers	Jarrow	United Kingdom	For Royal Navy.
16 September	Zulu	Tribal-class destroyer	Hawthorn Leslie	Tyneside	United Kingdom	For Royal Navy.
25 September	Helgoland	Helgoland-class battleship	Howaldtswerke-Deutsche Werft	Hamburg	Germany	For Imperial German Navy
30 September	Ostfriesland	Helgoland-class battleship	Kaiserliche Werft	Wilhelmshaven	Germany	For Imperial German Navy
30 September	Neptune	Neptune-class battleship	HM Dockyard	Portsmouth	United Kingdom	For Royal Navy
14 October	Cugnot	Pluviôse-class submarine	Arsenal de Rochefort	Rochefort	France	For French Navy
14 October	N.E.R. No. 9	Hopper barge	Blyth Shipbuilding & Dry Docks Co. Ltd	Blyth	United Kingdom	For North Eastern Railway.
15 October	V180	S138-class torpedo boat	AG Vulcan	Stettin	Germany	For Imperial German Navy
16 October	Beagle	Beagle-class destroyer	John Brown & Company	Clydebank	United Kingdom	For Royal Navy.
21 October	N.E.R. No. 11	Hopper barge	Blyth Shipbuilding & Dry Docks Co. Ltd	Blyth	United Kingdom	For North Eastern Railway.
28 October	Balantia	Cargo ship	Harland & Wolff	Belfast	United Kingdom	For Royal Mail Line.
28 October	Indefatigable	Indefatigable-class battlecruiser	HM Dockyard	Devonport	United Kingdom	For Royal Navy
28 October	Mirabeau	Danton-class battleship	Arsenal de Lorient	Lorient	France	For French Navy
28 October	N.E.R. No. 10	Hopper barge	Blyth Shipbuilding & Dry Docks Co. Ltd	Blyth	United Kingdom	For North Eastern Railway.
30 October	Ampère	Pluviôse-class submarine	Arsenal de Toulon	Toulon	France	For French Navy
30 October	City of Colombo	Cargo Ship	Swan Hunter & Wigham Richardson	Wallsend	United Kingdom	For Ellerman Lines
9 November	V181	S138-class torpedo boat	AG Vulcan	Stettin	Germany	For Imperial German Navy
12 November	Balmoral Castle	Ocean liner	Fairfield Shipbuilding and Engineering Company	Govan	United Kingdom	For Union-Castle Line
13 November 1909	Fructidor	Pluviôse-class submarine	Arsenal de Cherbourg	Cherbourg	France	For French Navy
13 November	Bulldog	Beagle-class destroyer	John Brown & Company	Clydebank	United Kingdom	For Royal Navy.
29 November	Thüringen	Helgoland-class battleship	AG Weser	Bremen	Germany	For Imperial German Navy
30 November	Martha	Humber Keel	Brown & Clapson	Barton-upon-Humber	United Kingdom	For Mr. Wilson.
1 December	V182	S138-class torpedo boat	AG Vulcan	Stettin	Germany	For Imperial German Navy
7 December	N.E.R. No. 12	Hopper barge	Blyth Shipbuilding & Dry Docks Co. Ltd	Blyth	United Kingdom	For North Eastern Railway.
11 December	Foxhound	Beagle-class destroyer	John Brown & Company	Clydebank	United Kingdom	For Royal Navy.
23 December	Utah	Florida-class battleship	New York Shipbuilding Corporation	Camden, New Jersey	United States	For United States Navy
23 December	V183	S138-class torpedo boat	AG Vulcan	Stettin	Germany	For Imperial German Navy
Date unknown	Adeline Hugo Stinnes 3	Merchant	Bremer Vulcan	Bremen-Vegesack	Germany	Converted as a seaplane carrier in World War I
Date unknown	Dei Gratia	Sloop	Brown & Clapson	Barton-upon-Humber	United Kingdom	For John W. Wilkinson.
Date unknown	Ellen A	Sloop	Brown & Clapson	Barton-upon-Humber	United Kingdom	For Edward Arnold.
Date unknown	Espagne	Ocean liner	Chantiers & Ateliers de Provence	Port de Bouc	France	For Compagnie Générale Transatlantique
Date unknown	G.A.W.	Steam drifter	Beeching Brothers Ltd.	Great Yarmouth	United Kingdom	For Charles A. Webster.
Date unknown	Morrison	Steam drifter	Beeching Brothers Ltd.	Great Yarmouth	United Kingdom	For Richard Sutton.
Date unknown	Pimpernel	Steam drifter	Beeching Brothers Ltd.	Great Yarmouth	United Kingdom	For J. S. Johnston & Sons Ltd.
Date unknown	Provencal 17	Tug	I. J. Abdela & Mitchell Ltd.	Queensferry	United Kingdom	For Société Provencale de Remorquage S.A.
Date unknown	Provencal 18	Tug	I. J. Abdela & Mitchell Ltd.	Queensferry	United Kingdom	For Société Provencale de Remorquage S.A.
Date unknown	Reiher	Cargo ship	Bremer Vulcan	Bremen-Vegesack	Germany	For Argo Line
Date unknown	Trelissick	Cargo ship	John Readhead & Sons Ltd.	South Shields	United Kingdom	For Hain Steamship Co.
Date unknown	Whatshan	Steam tug	Nakusp shipyard	Lower Arrow Lakes	Canada	For Canadian Pacific Railway
