= French submarine Watt =

Warship

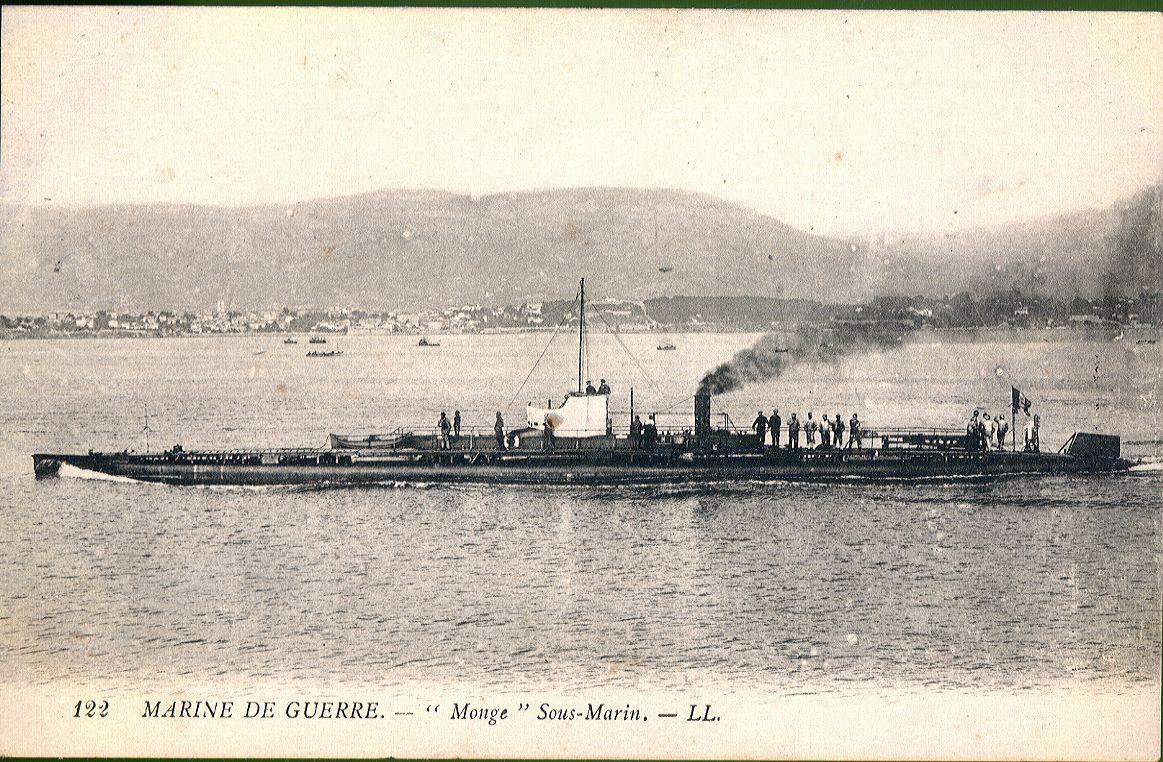
- A postcard of sister ship Monge underway before 1915

History

France
- Name: Watt
- Namesake: James Watt (1736–1819), Scottish inventor, mechanical engineer, and chemist
- Ordered: 26 August 1905 or 19 October 1906 (see text)
- Builder: Arsenal de Rochefort, Rochefort, France
- Laid down: 19 October 1906
- Launched: 18 June 1909
- Completed: 1910
- Commissioned: 15 March 1910
- Stricken: 1 December 1919
- Identification: Pennant number: Q75
- Fate: Condemned 16 October 1919; Sold for scrapping 11 June 1921

General characteristics (as built)
- Type: Submarine
- Displacement: 404 t (398 long tons) (surfaced); 553 t (544 long tons) (submerged)
- Length: 51.12 m (167 ft 9 in) (o/a)
- Beam: 4.96 m (16 ft 3 in)
- Draft: 3.15 m (10 ft 4 in)
- Installed power: 700 PS (510 kW; 690 bhp) (steam); 2 × du Temple boilers; 460 PS (340 kW; 450 bhp) (electric motors)
- Propulsion: 2 × shafts; 2 × triple-expansion steam engines; 2 × electric motors
- Speed: 12 knots (22 km/h; 14 mph) (surfaced); 8 knots (15 km/h; 9.2 mph) (submerged)
- Range: 1,000 nmi (1,900 km; 1,200 mi) at 8.5 knots (15.7 km/h; 9.8 mph) (surfaced); 27 nmi (50 km; 31 mi) at 5 knots (9.3 km/h; 5.8 mph) (submerged)
- Complement: 2 officers and 23 crewmen
- Armament: 6 × external 450 mm (17.7 in) torpedo launchers (4 × fixed, 2 × Drzewiecki drop collars)

Watt (Q75) was one of 18 Pluviôse-class submarines built for the French Navy (Marine Nationale) in the first decade of the 20th century. Commissioned in 1910, she served during World War I and was stricken in 1919.

== Design and description ==
The Pluviôse class were built as part of the French Navy's 1905 building program to a double-hull design by Maxime Laubeuf. The submarines displaced 404 metric tons (398 long tons) surfaced and 553 metric tons (544 long tons) submerged. They had an overall length of 51.12 meters (167 ft 9 in), a beam of 4.96 meters (16 ft 3 in), and a draft of 3.15 meters (10 ft 4 in). Their crew numbered two officers and 23 enlisted men.

For surface running, the submarines were powered by two 350-metric-horsepower (345 bhp; 257 kW) triple-expansion steam engines, each driving one propeller shaft using steam provided by two Du Temple boilers. When submerged, each propeller was driven by a 230-metric-horsepower (227 bhp; 169 kW) electric motor. On the surface they were designed to reach a maximum speed of 12 knots (22 km/h; 14 mph) and 8 knots (15 km/h; 9.2 mph) underwater. The submarines had a surface endurance of 865 nautical miles (1,602 km; 995 mi) at 11.6 knots (21.5 km/h; 13.3 mph) and a submerged endurance of 70 nmi (130 km; 81 mi) at 2.8 knots (5.2 km/h; 3.2 mph).

The first six submarines completed were armed with a single 450-millimeter (17.7 in) internal bow torpedo tube, but this was deleted from the rest of the submarines after an accident involving their sister ship Fresnel in 1909. All of the submarines were fitted with six 450-millimeter (17.7 in) external torpedo launchers; the pair firing forward were fixed outwards at an angle of seven degrees and the rear pair had an angle of five degrees. Following a ministerial order on 22 February 1910, the aft tubes were reversed so they too fired forward, but at an angle of eight degrees. The other launchers were a rotating pair of Drzewiecki drop collars in a single mount positioned on top of the hull at the stern. They could traverse 150 degrees to each side of the submarine. The Pluviôse-class submarines carried eight torpedoes.

== Construction and commissioning ==
Watt, named after the British 18th-century inventor James Watt, was ordered on either 26 August 1905 or 19 October 1906 (according to different sources) from the Arsenal de Rochefort in Rochefort, France. Her keel was laid down on 19 October 1906. She was launched on 18 June 1909. During her builder's sea trials, she suffered steam engine damage on 21 December 1909 that forced her to interrupt her trials and return to port.

Watt was completed in 1910. Her pre-acceptance trials were interrupted on 8 March 1910 when the Norwegian steamer SS Torgnay collided with and damaged her. She was commissioned on 15 March 1910 with the pennant number Q75.

== Service history ==
=== Pre-World War I ===
Watt struck either a breakwater, jetty, mole, or seawall as she returned to her anchorage on 3 December 1910. She suffered bow damage with an estimated repair time of two months.

By 1911, Watt was based at Brest, France. She was moored at a wharf at the Brest Arsenal on 10 June 1913 when the submarine Thermidor collided with her. Both submarines suffered damage, particularly Watt, which sustained a gash over 40 centimetres (16 in) in length in her external port ballast tank that required a substantial period of time to repair.

=== World War I ===
World War I broke out on 28 July 1914 with Austria-Hungary′s declaration of war on Serbia, and France entered the war on the side of the Allies when the German Empire declared war on France on 3 August 1914. After the declaration of war, Watt conducted patrols in the English Channel, and from September 1914 to June 1915 she was based in England at Portsmouth as part of defense agreements between France and the United Kingdom. From 14 to 22 September 1915 she operated in the Bay of Biscay between Brest and La Pallice.

By 17 January 1917, Watt was serving in the Mediterranean Sea, based at Bizerte in Tunisia. She patrolled off Algeria and in the Strait of Sicily.

Watt was the target of a friendly fire incident in 1918. At daybreak on 26 March 1918, she was on the surface in the Mediterranean Sea north of the Galite Islands off the coast of Tunisia when she crossed paths with an Allied convoy en route from Gibraltar to Bizerte, Tunisia, consisting of 15 ships escorted by the British Royal Navy warship HMS Jeannette II, the United States Navy armed yacht USS Wenonah, the U.S. Navy gunboat USS Nashville, and two French naval trawlers. An enemy submarine had torpedoed one of the convoy′s ships the during the previous night and the convoy′s escorts had just investigated an erroneous sighting of a purported submarine to port when Jeannette II sighted Watt ahead of the convoy. She assumed Watt was an enemy submarine. Watt submerged, and Jeannette II attacked her, dropping two depth charges and forcing her back to the surface. The British armed merchant ship SS Frank Parish, and according to one source several other ships in the convoy as well, then opened fire on Watt, as did Wenonah at a range of 1,000 yards (910 m). Wenonah fired twelve rounds, inflicting considerable damage on Watt, killing her commanding officer and wounding five others. The convoy overtook Watt, and Wenonah ceased fire to avoid hitting ships in the convoy. After members of Watt′s crew came on deck and waved their arms, the convoy′s escorts identified her as friendly. Jeannette II and one of the trawlers went to Watt′s assistance; Jeannette II took off her wounded, one of whom, a seaman, later died of his wounds, and the trawler escorted Watt into port.

A joint court of inquiry with one American, two British, and two French naval officers as members took place at Gibraltar and found no one to blame for the incident. Another joint court of inquiry consisting of two British and two French naval officers took place at Bizerte, and also found no one to blame, concluding that Watt had disobeyed orders governing submarines operating in the area.

== Final disposition ==
Watt was condemned on 16 October 1919 and stricken from the navy list on 1 December 1919. She was sold at Bizerte to Monsieur Crispin for 28,236 French francs on 11 June 1921 and subsequently scrapped.
