= French submarine Berthelot =

1900s French submarine

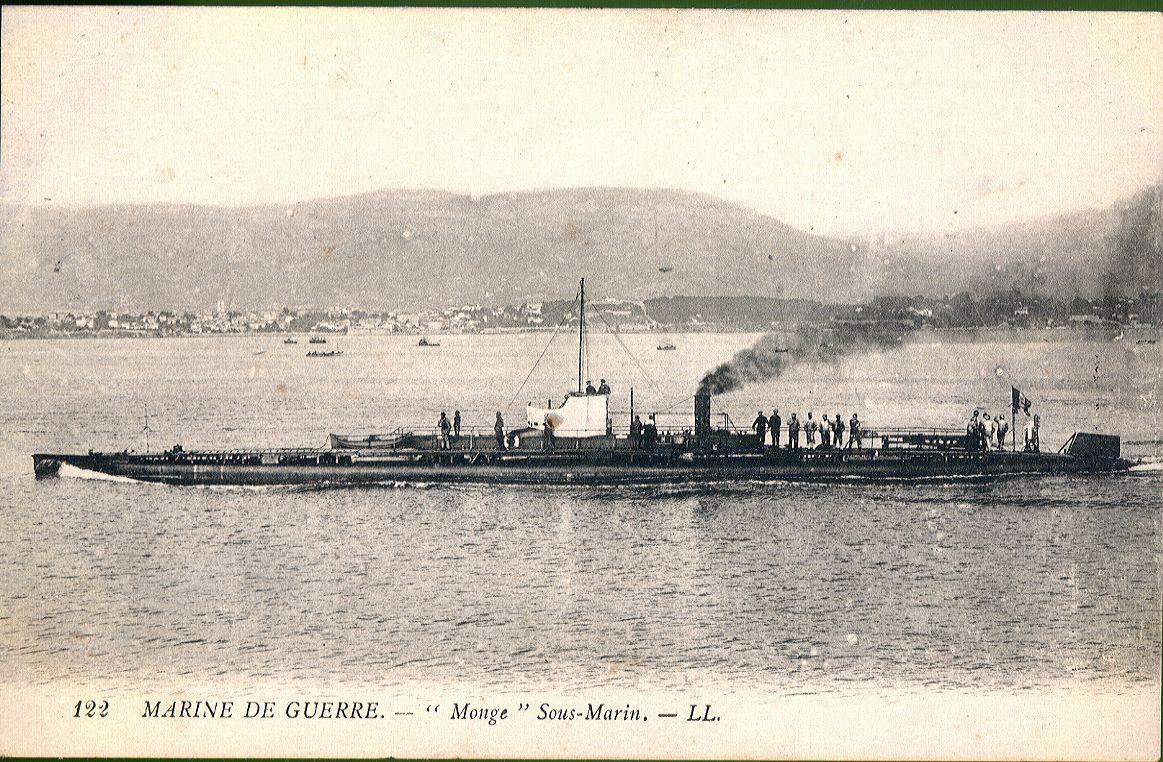
- A postcard of sister ship Monge underway before 1915

History

France
- Name: Berthelot
- Builder: Arsenal de Rochefort
- Laid down: 1906
- Launched: 18 May 1909
- Completed: 1 February 1910
- Stricken: 1 December 1919
- Identification: Pennant number: Q66
- Fate: Scrapped

General characteristics (as built)
- Type: Submarine
- Displacement: 404 t (398 long tons) (surfaced); 553 t (544 long tons) (submerged)
- Length: 51.12 m (167 ft 9 in) (o/a)
- Beam: 4.96 m (16 ft 3 in)
- Draft: 3.15 m (10 ft 4 in)
- Installed power: 700 PS (510 kW; 690 bhp) (steam); 2 × du Temple boilers; 460 PS (340 kW; 450 bhp) (electric motors)
- Propulsion: 2 × shafts; 2 × triple-expansion steam engines; 2 × electric motors
- Speed: 12 knots (22 km/h; 14 mph) (surfaced); 8 knots (15 km/h; 9.2 mph) (submerged)
- Range: 1,000 nmi (1,900 km; 1,200 mi) at 8.5 knots (15.7 km/h; 9.8 mph) (surfaced); 27 nmi (50 km; 31 mi) at 5 knots (9.3 km/h; 5.8 mph) (submerged)
- Complement: 2 officers and 23 crewmen
- Armament: 6 × external 450 mm (17.7 in) torpedo launchers (4 × fixed, 2 × Drzewiecki drop collars)

Berthelot (English: /bɛərtəˈloʊ/, French: [bɛʁtəlo]) was one of 18 Pluviôse-class submarines built for the French Navy (Marine Nationale) in the first decade of the 20th century.

== Design and description ==
The Pluviôse class were built as part of the French Navy's 1905 building program to a double-hull design by Maxime Laubeuf. The submarines displaced 404 metric tons (398 long tons) surfaced and 553 metric tons (544 long tons) submerged. They had an overall length of 51.12 meters (167 ft 9 in), a beam of 4.96 meters (16 ft 3 in), and a draft of 3.15 meters (10 ft 4 in). Their crew numbered 2 officers and 23 enlisted men.

For surface running, the boats were powered by two 350-metric-horsepower (345 bhp; 257 kW) triple-expansion steam engines, each driving one propeller shaft using steam provided by two Du Temple boilers. When submerged each propeller was driven by a 230-metric-horsepower (227 bhp; 169 kW) electric motor. On the surface they were designed to reach a maximum speed of 12 knots (22 km/h; 14 mph) and 8 knots (15 km/h; 9.2 mph) underwater. The submarines had a surface endurance of 865 nautical miles (1,602 km; 995 mi) at 11.6 knots (21.5 km/h; 13.3 mph) and a submerged endurance of 70 nmi (130 km; 81 mi) at 2.8 knots (5.2 km/h; 3.2 mph).

The first six boats completed were armed with a single 450-millimeter (17.7 in) internal bow torpedo tube, but this was deleted from the rest of the submarines after an accident with their sister Fresnel in 1909. All of the boats were fitted with six 450 mm external torpedo launchers; the pair firing forward were fixed outwards at an angle of seven degrees and the rear pair had an angle of five degrees. Following a ministerial order on 22 February 1910, the aft tubes were reversed so they too fired forward, but at an angle of eight degrees. The other launchers were a rotating pair of Drzewiecki drop collars in a single mount positioned on top of the hull at the stern. They could traverse 150 degrees to each side of the boat. The Pluviôse-class submarines carried eight torpedoes.

== Construction and career ==
Berthelot, named after the 19th-century chemist Marcellin Berthelot, was ordered on 26 August 1905 from the Arsenal de Rochefort. The submarine was laid down in 1906, launched on 18 May 1909 and commissioned on 1 February 1910.

== Bibliography ==
- Couhat, Jean Labayle (1974). French Warships of World War I. London: Ian Allan. ISBN 0-7110-0445-5.
- Gardiner, Robert & Gray, Randal (1985). Conway's All The World's Fighting Ships 1906–1921. London: Conway Maritime Press. ISBN 0-85177-245-5.
- Garier, Gérard (2002). A l'épreuve de la Grande Guerre. L'odyssée technique et humaine du sous-marin en France (in French). Vol. 3–2. Bourg-en-Bresse, France: Marines édition. ISBN 2-909675-81-5.
- Garier, Gérard (1998). Des Émeraude (1905-1906) au Charles Brun (1908–1933). L'odyssée technique et humaine du sous-marin en France (in French). Vol. 2. Bourg-en-Bresse, France: Marines édition. ISBN 2-909675-34-3.
