= Q52 =

Q52 may refer to:

- Q52 (New York City bus)
- At-Tur, a surah of the Quran
- French submarine Ventôse
