= Q59 =

Q59 may refer to:

- Q59 (New York City bus)
- Al-Hashr, a surah of the Quran
- French submarine Vendémiaire (Q59)
