= Q56 =

Q56 may refer to:

- Q56 (New York City bus)
- Al-Waqi'a, a surah of the Quran
- French submarine Messidor
