= Pluviôse-class submarine =

Early 20th century French submarine class

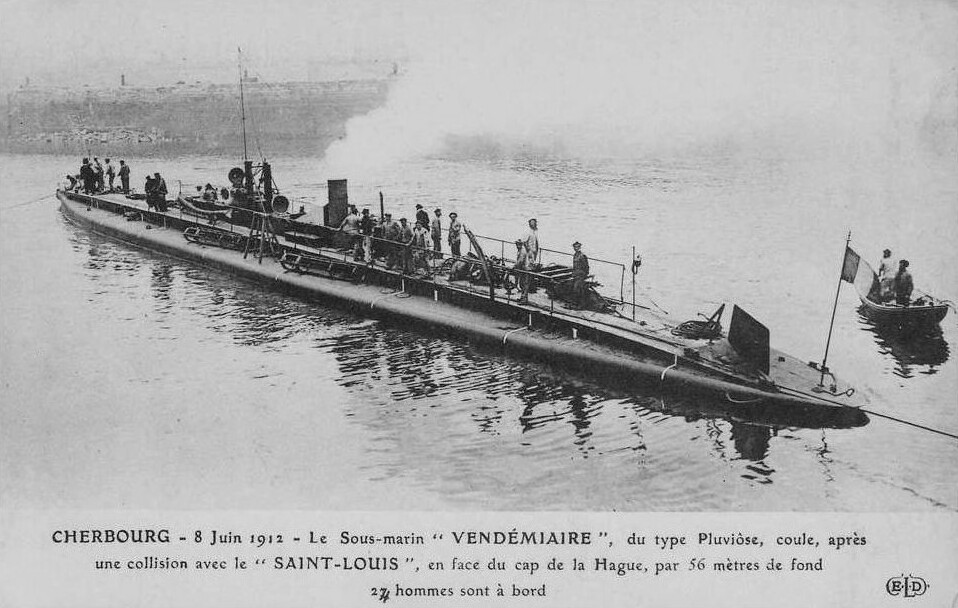
- A postcard of Vendémiaire in harbor, 8 June 1912, before her collision with the battleship Saint Louis

Class overview
- Name: Pluviôse class
- Operators: French Navy
- Preceded by: Circé class
- Succeeded by: Brumaire class
- Subclasses: Thermidor
- Built: 1908–1911
- In commission: 1908–1919
- Completed: 18
- Lost: 5
- Scrapped: 13

General characteristics (as built)
- Type: Submarine
- Displacement: 404 t (398 long tons) (surfaced); 553 t (544 long tons) (submerged)
- Length: 51.12 m (167 ft 9 in) (o/a)
- Beam: 4.96 m (16 ft 3 in)
- Draft: 3.15 m (10 ft 4 in)
- Installed power: 700 PS (510 kW; 690 bhp) (steam); 2 × du Temple boilers; 460 PS (340 kW; 450 bhp) (electric motors)
- Propulsion: 2 × shafts; 2 × triple-expansion steam engines; 2 × electric motors
- Speed: 12 knots (22 km/h; 14 mph) (surfaced); 8 knots (15 km/h; 9.2 mph) (submerged)
- Range: 1,000 nmi (1,900 km; 1,200 mi) at 8.5 knots (15.7 km/h; 9.8 mph) (surfaced); 27 nmi (50 km; 31 mi) at 5 knots (9.3 km/h; 5.8 mph) (submerged)
- Complement: 2 officers and 23 crewmen
- Armament: 1 × 450 mm (17.7 in) bow torpedo tube (first 6 boats only); 6 × external 450 mm (17.7 in) torpedo launchers (4 × fixed, 2 × Drzewiecki drop collars)

The Pluviôse-class submarines were a group of 18 submarines built for the French Navy in the first decade of the 20th century. Before World War I, two were accidentally lost, but one of these was salvaged and put back into service. Four others were lost during the war and the survivors were stricken in 1919.

== Design and description ==
The Pluviôse class were built as part of the French Navy's 1905 building program to a double-hull design by Maxime Laubeuf. The submarines displaced 404 metric tons (398 long tons) surfaced and 553 metric tons (544 long tons) submerged. They had an overall length of 51.12 meters (167 ft 9 in), a beam of 4.96 meters (16 ft 3 in), and a draft of 3.15 meters (10 ft 4 in). Thermidor differed from her sisters as she was built to test the hull shape planned for the following Brumaire class. She had an overall length of 52.15 m (171 ft 1 in), a beam of 5.42 m (17 ft 9 in) and displaced 396 t (390 long tons) on the surface and 551 t (542 long tons) underwater. The submarines had a crew of 2 officers and 23 enlisted men.

For surface running, the boats were powered by two 350-metric-horsepower (345 bhp; 257 kW) triple-expansion steam engines, each driving one propeller shaft using steam provided by two Du Temple boilers. When submerged each propeller was driven by a 230-metric-horsepower (227 bhp; 169 kW) electric motor. On the surface they were designed to reach a maximum speed of 12 knots (22 km/h; 14 mph) and 8 knots (15 km/h; 9.2 mph) underwater. The submarines had a surface endurance of 865 nautical miles (1,602 km; 995 mi) at 11.6 knots (21.5 km/h; 13.3 mph) and a submerged endurance of 70 nmi (130 km; 81 mi) at 2.8 knots (5.2 km/h; 3.2 mph).

The first six boats completed (Pluviôse, Messidor, Ventôse, Germinal, Floréal and Prairial) were armed with a single 450-millimeter (17.7 in) internal bow torpedo tube, but after an accident that lead to the sinking of Fresnel in 1909, the tubes were removed from Pluviôse and Messidor. A ministerial order of 18 March 1910 added one to Vendémiaire while she was still under construction, but the bow tubes were deleted from the rest of the class. All of the boats were fitted with six 450 mm external torpedo launchers; the pair firing forward were fixed outwards at an angle of seven degrees and the rear pair had an angle of five degrees. Following a ministerial order on 22 February 1910, the aft tubes were reversed so they too fired forward, but at an angle of eight degrees. The other launchers were a rotating pair of Drzewiecki drop collars in a single mount positioned on top of the hull at the stern. They could traverse 150 degrees to each side of the boat. The Pluviôse-class submarines carried eight torpedoes; those with bow tubes carried their reload in the torpedo compartment.

== Ships in class ==
Pluviôse-class submarines
Name	Builder	Laid down	Launched	Commissioned	Fate
Ampère Q68	Arsenal de Toulon	1906	30 October 1909	1 November 1910	Stricken, 12 November 1919
Berthelot Q66	Arsenal de Rochefort	1906	19 May 1909	1 February 1910	Stricken, 1 December 1919
Cugnot Q76	Arsenal de Rochefort	1906	14 October 1909	10 September 1910	Stricken, 1 December 1919
Floréal Q54	Arsenal de Cherbourg	1906	18 October 1908	16 June 1909	Sunk in collision with British armed boarding steamer HMS Hazel, 2 August 1918
Fresnel Q65	Arsenal de Rochefort	1906	16 June 1908	22 February 1911	Torpedoed by Austro-Hungarian destroyers, 5 February 1915
Fructidor Q58	Arsenal de Cherbourg	1906	13 November 1909	29 June 1910	Stricken, 12 November 1919
Gay-Lussac Q69	Arsenal de Toulon	1906	17 March 1910	14 January 1911	Stricken, 1 December 1919
Germinal Q53	Arsenal de Cherbourg	1906	7 December 1907	30 December 1908	Stricken, 1 December 1919
Giffard Q77	Arsenal de Rochefort	1906	10 February 1910	13 October 1910	Stricken, 1 December 1919
Messidor Q56	Arsenal de Cherbourg	1906	24 December 1908	30 November 1909	Stricken, 12 November 1919
Monge Q67	Arsenal de Toulon	1906	31 December 1908	2 August 1910	Rammed by Austro-Hungarian scout cruiser SMS Helgoland, 29 December 1915
Papin Q64	Arsenal de Rochefort	1906	4 January 1908	1 September 1909	Unknown
Pluviôse Q51	Arsenal de Cherbourg	1906	27 May 1907	5 October 1908	Sunk in collision, 26 May 1910. Raised and repaired. Stricken, 12 November 1919
Prairial Q55	Arsenal de Cherbourg	1906	26 September 1908	16 June 1909	Sunk in collision with SS Tropic, 29 April 1918
Thermidor Q57	Arsenal de Cherbourg	1906	3 July 1909	13 July 1910	Stricken, 12 November 1919
Vendémiaire Q59	Arsenal de Cherbourg	1906	7 July 1910	4 February 1911	Sunk in collision with French battleship Saint Louis, 8 June 1912
Ventôse Q52	Arsenal de Cherbourg	1906	15 September 1907	5 October 1908	Stricken, 1 December 1919
Watt Q75	Arsenal de Rochefort	1906	18 June 1909	15 March 1910	Stricken, 1 December 1919

== Service ==
The Pluviôse class were acknowledged to be good sea boats and saw action throughout the First World War on patrol and close blockade duty. Of the eighteen built, five were lost. One (Vendémiaire) was accidentally lost prior to the war, in 1912. Two others, Floréal and Priarial, were lost accidentally during the conflict, while Monge and Fresnel were lost in action.

== See also ==
- List of submarines of France

== Bibliography ==
- Couhat, Jean Labayle (1974). French Warships of World War I. London: Ian Allan. ISBN 0-7110-0445-5.
- Garier, Gérard (2002). A l'épreuve de la Grande Guerre. L'odyssée technique et humaine du sous-marin en France (in French). Vol. 3–2. Bourg-en-Bresse, France: Marines édition. ISBN 2-909675-81-5.
- Garier, Gérard (1998). Des Émeraude (1905–1906) au Charles Brun (1908–1933). L'odyssée technique et humaine du sous-marin en France (in French). Vol. 2. Bourg-en-Bresse, France: Marines édition. ISBN 2-909675-34-3.
- Roche, Jean-Michel (2005). Dictionnaire des bâtiments de la flotte de guerre française de Colbert à nos jours 2, 1870 - 2006. Toulon: Roche. ISBN 978-2-9525917-0-6. OCLC 165892922.
- Smigielski, Adam (1985). "France". In Gray, Randal (ed.). Conway's All the World's Fighting Ships 1906–1921. Annapolis, Maryland: Naval Institute Press. pp. 190–220. ISBN 0-87021-907-3.
