= Maxime Laubeuf =

French maritime engineer

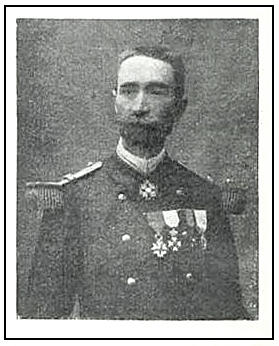
Maxime Laubeuf

Maxime Laubeuf was a French maritime engineer of the late nineteenth century. He was born on 23 November 1864 at Poissy, Yvelines, and died on 23 December 1939 in Cannes, Alpes-Maritimes.

Laubeuf was a pioneer in the design and building of submarines, and was responsible for a number of the innovations that led to modern submarine design. His work had a profound influence on the design of submersibles in the late nineteenth century and early twentieth century.

Laubeuf studied at the Ecole Polytechnique, and after graduating in 1883, he joined ENSTA, the French military's school of Marine Engineering.

He became an Assistant Engineer in 1887, and Engineer in 1891. During this time, he worked at Brest on the development of submersibles and designs for the first modern submarines in 1904. Two years later, he left the Navy to continue building submarines in private industry.

In 1896, the French government staged a design competition for a submarine of advanced capabilities. They required a 200-ton vessel with a surface speed of 12 knots and a 100-mile range, with a submerged speed of 6 knots and a 10-mile range. Laubeuf's design, Narval, was the winner out of 29 entries.

Laubeuf determined that to run efficiently on the surface and submerged his submarine would need two separate power systems; most designers up to that point had tried to find a single system for both, with mixed success. The high surface speed demanded made a steam system necessary for surface running, while using an electric motor underwater. He also arranged to use the surface engine to re-charge the batteries for the electric motor whilst on the surface.

Laubeuf also tackled the stability problem that beset submarine designs. The rounded pressure hull necessary to withstand the pressure at depth was a poor shape for sailing, making them unhandy on the surface and unstable submerged. Laubeufs's design had a double hull; an inner, rounded, reinforced hull to resist pressure, and an outer, boat-shaped hull to make the vessel seaworthy. These innovations were a leap forward in submarine design, and were adopted by navies around the world.

Laubeuf became a member of the French Naval Academy and was elected member of the French Academy of Sciences in 1920.
