= List of ship launches in 1915 =

The list of ship launches in 1915 includes a chronological list of ships launched in 1915.

Date	Ship	Class / type	Builder	Location	Country	Notes
5 January	Gavriil	Orfey-class destroyer	Russo-Baltic Yard	Reval	Russia	
8 January	Teodo	Pola-class collier	Stabilimento Tecnico Triestino	Trieste	Austria-Hungary	
14 January	Resolution	Revenge-class battleship	Palmers Shipbuilding and Iron Company	Jarrow, England	United Kingdom	
15 January	Tb 100 M	250t-class torpedo boat	Cantiere Navale Triestino	Monfalcone	Austria-Hungary	
16 January	Cushing	O'Brien-class destroyer	Fore River Shipbuilding Company	Quincy, Massachusetts	United States	
16 January	Earl of Peterborough	Monitor	Harland & Wolff	Belfast	United Kingdom	For Royal Navy.
16 January	G39	V25-class torpedo boat	Germaniawerft	Kiel	Germany	
18 January	Birkenhead	Town-class cruiser	Cammell Laird	Birkenhead	United Kingdom	
18 January	Hebburn	Cargo ship	Blyth Shipbuilding & Dry Docks Co. Ltd	Blyth	United Kingdom	For Huddart Parker Ltd.
19 January	Glengyle	Cargo ship	Harland & Wolff	Belfast	United Kingdom	For Glen Line..
27 January	V43	V25-class torpedo boat	AG Vulcan	Stettin	Germany	
9 February	United States	Seattle Construction and Drydock Company	Seattle, Washington	Bushnell	submarine tender	
11 February	Winslow	O'Brien-class destroyer	William Cramp & Sons	Philadelphia	United States	
13 February	Andromaque	Amphitrite-class submarine	Arsenal de Cherbourg	Cherbourg	France	For French Navy
14 February	Czaritza	Passenger ship	Barclay, Curle & Co. Ltd.	Glasgow	United Kingdom	For Russian American Line.
18 February	Bayern	Bayern-class battleship	Howaldtswerke	Kiel	Germany	
24 February	V44	V25-class torpedo boat	AG Vulcan	Stettin	Germany	
27 February	G40	V25-class torpedo boat	Germaniawerft	Kiel	Germany	
3 March	Condé	Screw steamer	Forges et Chantiers de la Méditerranée	Le Havre	France	For Cie. Havraise Péninsulaire de Navigation à Vapeur
13 March	Gharb	Screw steamer	Forges et Chantiers de la Méditerranée	La Seyne	France	For Cie. Rouennaise de Transports Maritimes
16 March	Pennsylvania	Pennsylvania-class battleship	Newport News Shipbuilding	Newport News, Virginia	United States	
18 March	Malaya	Queen Elizabeth-class battleship	Armstrong Whitworth	Walker-on-Tyne	United Kingdom	
20 March	Tb 87 F	250t-class torpedo boat	Ganz & Danubius	Fiume	Austria-Hungary	
29 March	V45	V25-class torpedo boat	AG Vulcan	Stettin	Germany	
10 April	S49	V25-class torpedo boat	Schichau-Werke	Elbing	Germany	
12 April	Nimrod	Marksman-class flotilla leader	William Denny and Brothers	Dumbarton	United Kingdom	
14 April	Glenartney	Cargo ship	Harland & Wolff	Belfast	United Kingdom	For Glen Line.
15 April	Atalante	Amphitrite-class submarine	Arsenal de Toulon	Toulon	France	For French Navy
15 April	Abercrombie	Monitor	Harland & Wolff	Belfast	United Kingdom	For Royal Navy.
15 April	U-45	Type U-43 submarine	Kaiserliche Werft Danzig	Danzig	Germany	
19 April	Marconi	Cargo ship	Harland & Wolff	Belfast	United Kingdom	For Lamport and Holt.
24 April	G41	V25-class torpedo boat	Germaniawerft	Kiel	Germany	
24 April	S50	V25-class torpedo boat	Schichau-Werke	Elbing	Germany	
28 April	Marksman	Marksman-class flotilla leader	Hawthorn Leslie and Company	Hebburn	United Kingdom	
29 April	Havelock	Monitor	Harland & Wolff	Belfast	United Kingdom	For Royal Navy
29 April	Raglan	Monitor	Harland & Wolff	Govan	United Kingdom	For Royal Navy
29 April	Royal Sovereign	Revenge-class battleship	HM Dockyard	Portsmouth	United Kingdom	
29 April	S51	V25-class torpedo boat	Schichau-Werke	Elbing	Germany	
1 May	Kempenfelt	Marksman-class flotilla leader	Cammell Laird	Birkenhead	United Kingdom	
3 May	Sverige	Sverige-class coastal defence ship	Götaverken	Gothenburg	Sweden	
4 May	Tucker	Tucker-class destroyer	Fore River Shipbuilding Company	Quincy, Massachusetts	United States	
15 May	Mécanicien Principal Lestin	Enseigne Roux-class destroyer	Arsenal de Rochefort	Rochefort	France	
18 May	U-46	Type U-43 submarine	Kaiserliche Werft Danzig	Danzig	Germany	
20 May	G42	V25-class torpedo boat	Germaniawerft	Kiel	Germany	
22 May	M29	Monitor	Harland & Wolff	Belfast	United Kingdom	For Royal Navy
22 May	M32	Monitor	Workman Clark		United Kingdom	For Royal Navy
22 May	M33	Monitor	Workman Clark		United Kingdom	For Royal Navy
28 May	Lightfoot	Marksman-class flotilla leader	J. Samuel White	Cowes	United Kingdom	
29 May	Revenge	Revenge-class battleship	Vickers Armstrong	Barrow-in-Furness, England	United Kingdom	
10 June	Laburnum	Acacia-class sloop	Charles Connell and Company	Scotstoun	United Kingdom	
10 June	Lord Clive	Monitor	Harland & Wolff	Belfast	United Kingdom	For Royal Navy
10 June	V47	V25-class torpedo boat	AG Vulcan	Stettin	Germany	
12 June	S52	V25-class torpedo boat	Schichau-Werke	Elbing	Germany	
19 June	Arizona	Pennsylvania-class battleship	New York Naval Shipyard	Brooklyn, New York	United States	
23 June	M30	Monitor	Harland & Wolff	Belfast	United Kingdom	For Royal Navy.
24 June	M31	Monitor	Harland & Wolff	Belfast	United Kingdom	For Royal Navy.
8 July	Conyngham	Tucker-class destroyer	William Cramp & Sons	Philadelphia	United States	
8 July	General Craufurd	Monitor	Harland & Wolff	Belfast	United Kingdom	For Royal Navy.
13 July	Enseigne Roux	Enseigne Roux-class destroyer	Arsenal de Rochefort	Rochefort	France	
14 July	Prince Eugene	Monitor	Harland & Wolff	Govan	United Kingdom	For Royal Navy.
1 August	Hindenburg	Derfflinger-class battlecruiser	Kaiserliche Werft	Wilhelmshaven	Germany	
6 August	V48	V25-class torpedo boat	AG Vulcan	Stettin	Germany	
16 August	U-47	Type U-43 submarine	Kaiserliche Werft Danzig	Danzig	Germany	
24 August	Lassoo	Laforey-class destroyer	William Beardmore and Company	Dalmuir	United Kingdom	
28 August	Torrens	River-class torpedo-boat destroyer	Cockatoo Dockyard	Sydney	Australia	
7 September	Ceará	Submarine support ship	FIAT-San Giorgio	La Spezia	Italy	For Brazilian Navy.
11 September	Mounsey	Yarrow M-class destroyer	Yarrow Shipbuilders	Scotstoun	United Kingdom	
18 September	S53	V25-class torpedo boat	Schichau-Werke	Elbing	Germany	
30 September	Brisbane	Town-class cruiser	Cockatoo Dockyard	Sydney	Australia	
30 September	Sir Thomas Picton	Monitor	Harland & Wolff	Belfast	United Kingdom	For Royal Navy
3 October	U-48	Type U-43 submarine	Kaiserliche Werft Danzig	Danzig	Germany	
12 October	Abdiel	Marksman-class flotilla leader	Cammell Laird	Birkenhead	United Kingdom	
14 October	Artémis	Amphitrite-class submarine	Arsenal de Toulon	Toulon	France	For French Navy
18 October	UB-24	Type UB II submarine	AG Weser	Bremen	Germany	
29 October	Vigrid	Cargo ship	Bergens Mekaniske Verksted	Bergen, Norway	Norway	
30 October	Baden	Bayern-class battleship	Schichau-Werke	Danzig	Germany	
9 November	Verbena	Arabis-class sloop	Blyth Shipbuilding & Dry Docks Co. Ltd	Blyth	United Kingdom	For Royal Navy.
11 November	Amarante	Astrée-class submarine	Arsenal de Toulon	Toulon	France	For French Navy
22 November	Rosemary	Arabis-class sloop	Richardson, Duck and Company	Thornaby-on-Tees	United Kingdom	
23 November	Gorgone	Bellone-class submarine	Arsenal de Toulon	Toulon	France	For French Navy
24 November	Honor Storey	Coaster	I. J. Abdela & Mitchell Ltd.	Queensferry	United Kingdom	For Darwen & Mostyn Iron Co. Ltd.
24 November	P24	Patrol boat	Harland & Wolff	Govan	United Kingdom	For Royal Navy.
25 November	Tb 93 F	250t-class torpedo boat	Ganz & Danubius	Fiume	Austria-Hungary	
6 December	Astrée	Astrée-class submarine	Arsenal de Rochefort	Rochefort	France	For French Navy
11 December	Swan	River-class torpedo-boat destroyer	Cockatoo Dockyard	Sydney	Australia	
18 December	Chester	Town-class cruiser	Cammell Laird	Birkenhead	United Kingdom	
18 December	Königsberg	Königsberg-class cruiser	AG Weser	Bremen	Germany	For Kaiserliche Marine
23 December	Gabriel	Marksman-class flotilla leader	Cammell Laird	Birkenhead	United Kingdom	
December	Tyndareus	Cargo liner	Scotts Shipbuilding and Engineering Company	Greenock	United Kingdom	For Ocean Steamship Company
Unknown date	A 18	Tug	I. J. Abdela & Mitchell Ltd.	Queensferry	United Kingdom	For War Office.
Unknown date	Bongo	Barge	I. J. Abdela & Mitchell Ltd.	Queensferry	United Kingdom	For Lever Bros. Ltd.
Unknown date	Brosen	Tanker	Howaldtswerke	Kiel	Germany	For German Government.
Unknown date	Dolo	Barge	I. J. Abdela & Mitchell Ltd.	Queensferry	United Kingdom	For Lever Bros. Ltd.
Unknown date	X 79	Landing craft	Blyth Shipbuilding & Dry Docks Co. Ltd	Blyth	United Kingdom	For Royal Navy.
Unknown date	X 80	Landing craft	Blyth Shipbuilding & Dry Docks Co. Ltd	Blyth	United Kingdom	For Royal Navy.
Unknown date	X 81	Landing craft	Blyth Shipbuilding & Dry Docks Co. Ltd	Blyth	United Kingdom	For Royal Navy.
Unknown date	X 82	Landing craft	Blyth Shipbuilding & Dry Docks Co. Ltd	Blyth	United Kingdom	For Royal Navy.
Unknown date	X 83	Landing craft	Blyth Shipbuilding & Dry Docks Co. Ltd	Blyth	United Kingdom	For Royal Navy.
Unknown date	X 84	Landing craft	Blyth Shipbuilding & Dry Docks Co. Ltd	Blyth	United Kingdom	For Royal Navy.
Unknown date	X 85	Landing craft	Blyth Shipbuilding & Dry Docks Co. Ltd	Blyth	United Kingdom	For Royal Navy.
Unknown date	X 86	Landing craft	Blyth Shipbuilding & Dry Docks Co. Ltd	Blyth	United Kingdom	For Royal Navy.
Unknown date	X 87	Landing craft	Blyth Shipbuilding & Dry Docks Co. Ltd	Blyth	United Kingdom	For Royal Navy.
Unknown date	X 88	Landing craft	Blyth Shipbuilding & Dry Docks Co. Ltd	Blyth	United Kingdom	For Royal Navy.
Unknown date	Yumbi	Barge	I. J. Abdela & Mitchell Ltd.	Queensferry	United Kingdom	For Lever Bros. Ltd.
Unknown date	Zambi	Barge	I. J. Abdela & Mitchell Ltd.	Queensferry	United Kingdom	For Lever Bros. Ltd.
