= Q99 =

Q99 may refer to:

== Radio stations ==
- CIKT-FM, in Grand Prairie, Alberta
- WSLQ, in Roanoke, Virginia
- WWWQ, in Atlanta, Georgia

== Other uses ==
- Q99 (New York City bus)
- Al-Zalzalah, the 99th surah of the Quran
- French submarine Amarante
- San Martin Airport, in Santa Clara County, California, United States
