= French ship Daphné =

Two submarines of the French Navy have borne the name Daphné:

- French submarine Daphné (1915), a Diane-class submarine launched in 1915 and struck in 1935.
- French submarine Daphné (S641), a Daphne-class submarine completed in 1964 and struck in 1989.
