= French ship Atalante =

Several ships of the French Navy have borne the name Atalante:

- Atalante (1707), a 40-gun ship, broken up in 1733.
- Atalante (1741), a 32-gun ship, sunk in 1760.
- Atalante (1768), was a French 32-gun frigate launched in 1768 HMS Swiftsure captured in 1794. The Royal Navy took her into service as HMS Espion. She became a floating battery in 1798, then a troop transport in 1799; she was wrecked in 1799 on the Goodwin Sands.
- Atalante (1794), captured in 1797 and taken into service as HMS Atalante. She was wrecked in 1807.
- Atalante (1802), a 44-gun Virginie-class frigate, wrecked in 1805.
- Atalante (1812), a Pallas-class frigate.
- Atalante (1869), an Alma-class wooden-hulled armored corvette condemned in 1887. She sank at Saigon shortly afterwards.
- Atalante (1915), an Amphitrite-class submarine launched in 1915 and struck in 1933.
- Atalante (1930), an Argonaute-class submarine launched in 1930 and struck in 1946.
- Atalante (1989) owned by the IFREMER research institute, carrying the Victor 6000 undersea robot.
