= French ship Gorgone =

Three ships of the French Navy have borne the name Gorgone:

- French corvette Gorgone (1848), a second class paddle corvette launched in 1848 and wrecked in 1869.
- French submarine Gorgone (1915), a Bellone-class submarine launched in 1915 and struck in 1935.
- French submarine Gorgone (Q212), an Aurore-class submarine scrapped incomplete on slip in 1940.
