= Q98 =

Q98 may refer to:

== Radio stations ==
- CJCQ-FM, in North Battleford, Saskatchewan
- KQWB-FM, in Fargo, North Dakota
- WXXQ, in Rockford, Illinois

== Other uses ==
- Q98 (New York City bus)
- Al-Bayyina, the 98th surah of the Quran
- French submarine Atalante (1915)
