= Diane-class submarine =

Diane-class submarine may refer to one of the following classes of submarine for the French Navy:

- Diane-class submarine (1916) in service 1916–1935
- Diane-class submarine (1930) in service 1931–1946
