= Q94 =

Q94 may refer to:

== Radio stations ==
- CHIQ. Q94 in Winnipeg, Manitoba
- WRVQ, Q94 in Richmond, Virginia
- WBXQ, Q94 in Altoona, Pennsylvania
- KQXY, Q94 in Beaumont, Texas
- KLVQ, Q94 in Mount Pleasant, Texas

== Other uses ==
- Al-Inshirah, the 94th surah of the Quran
- French submarine Amphitrite (1914)
