= Q97 =

Q97 may refer to:

== Radio stations ==
Canada

- CKEZ-FM, in New Glasgow, Nova Scotia

New Zealand

- Q97, operated by Radio Bay of Plenty in New Zealand

United States

- KCMQ, in Columbia, Missouri (former incarnation)
- KKJQ, in Garden City, Kansas
- KQHN, in Waskom, Texas
- WKJQ-FM, in Parsons, Tennessee
- WUUQ, in South Pittsburg, Tennessee

== Other uses ==
- Al-Qadr (surah), of the Quran
- French submarine Aréthuse (1916)
