= Q96 (disambiguation) =

Q96 was a radio station in Renfrewshire, Scotland.

Q96 may also refer to:

- Al-Alaq, a surah of the Quran
- French submarine Artémis (1914)
