= French submarine Hermione (1917) =

Bellone-class submarine

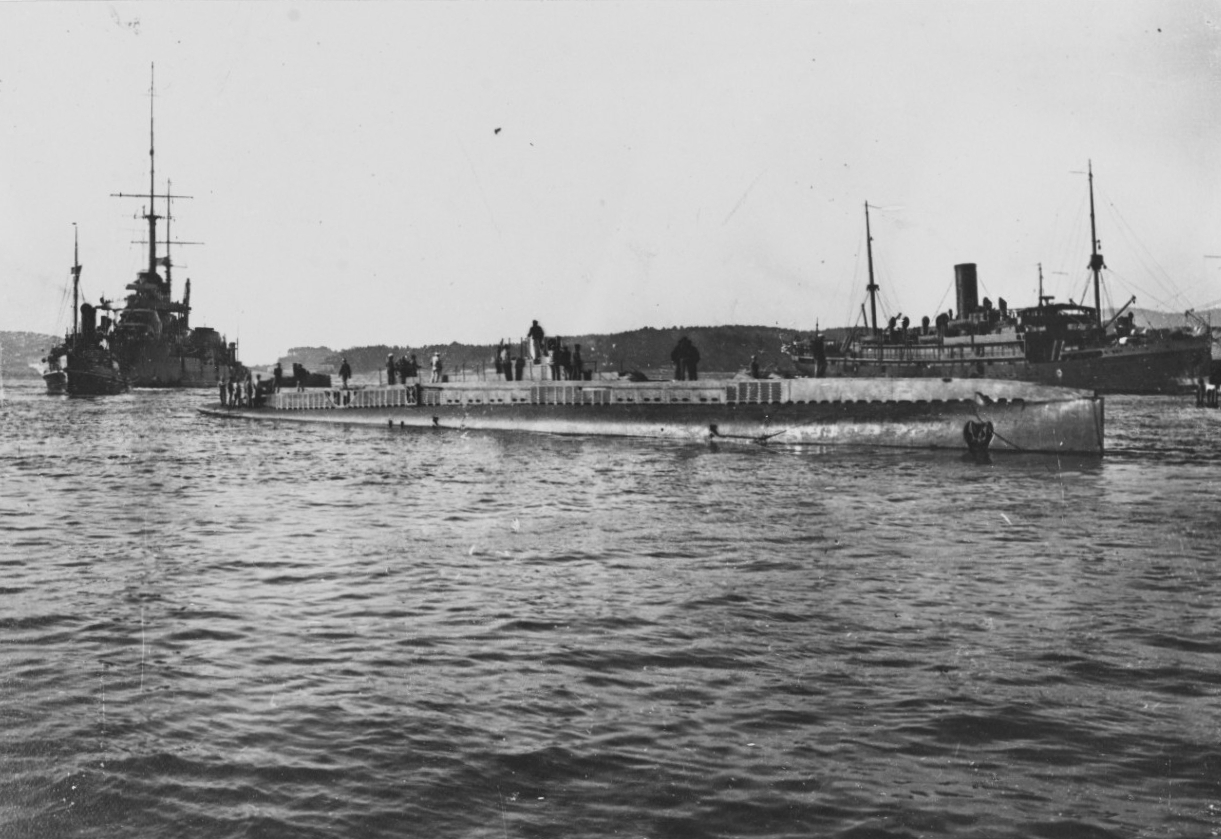
- Unidentified Bellone-class submarine underway at Toulon, 1914–18

History

France
- Name: Hermione
- Ordered: 3 October 1912
- Builder: Arsenal de Toulon
- Laid down: 14 April 1913
- Launched: 15 March 1917
- Commissioned: 27 April 1918
- Stricken: 27 August 1935
- Identification: Budget number: Q103
- Fate: Sold for scrap, 6 August 1936

General characteristics (as built)
- Class & type: Bellone-class submarine
- Displacement: 540 t (531 long tons) (surfaced); 804 t (791 long tons) (submerged)
- Length: 60 m (196 ft 10 in) (o/a)
- Beam: 5.4 m (17 ft 9 in) (deep)
- Draft: 3.8 m (12 ft 6 in)
- Installed power: 2 × 820 PS (600 kW; 810 hp) diesel engines; 2 × 400 PS (290 kW; 390 hp) electric motors
- Propulsion: 2 shafts
- Speed: 15 knots (28 km/h; 17 mph) (surfaced); 8.2 knots (15.2 km/h; 9.4 mph) (submerged)
- Range: 1,859 nmi (3,443 km; 2,139 mi) at 12 knots (22 km/h; 14 mph) (surfaced); 100 nmi (190 km; 120 mi) at 5 knots (9.3 km/h; 5.8 mph) (submerged)
- Complement: 28 crew
- Armament: 2 × internal bow 450 mm (17.7 in) torpedo tubes; 2 × external stern 450 mm torpedo tubes; 4 × single 450 mm rotating torpedo launchers; 1 × single 75 mm (3 in) deck gun

Hermione was one of three Bellone-class submarines built for the French Navy during World War I. Completed in 1918, she played a minor role during the war.

== Design and description ==
The Bellone class was built as part of the French Navy's 1912 building program, intended as enlarged and faster versions of the Clorinde class. The boats displaced 540 metric tons (530 long tons) surfaced and 804 t (791 long tons) submerged. They had an overall length of 60 meters (196 ft 10 in), a beam of 5.4 meters (17 ft 9 in), and a draft of 3.8 meters (12 ft 6 in). The crew numbered 28 officers and crewmen.

For surface running, the Bellones were powered by a pair of six-cylinder, two-cycle diesel engines, each driving one propeller shaft. The engines were provided by two different manufacturers and were intended to produce a total of 1,800 metric horsepower (1,775 bhp; 1,324 kW), but were generally only capable of about 820 PS (809 bhp; 603 kW). During her sister Bellone's sea trials on 12 September 1916, her Chaléassière engines only produced 1,600 PS (1,578 bhp; 1,177 kW), enough for a speed of 15.9 knots (29.4 km/h; 18.3 mph) rather than the designed 17 knots (31 km/h; 20 mph). The boats were generally capable of 15 knots (28 km/h; 17 mph) on the surface in service. When submerged each shaft was driven by a 400-metric-horsepower (395 shp; 294 kW) electric motor. The designed speed underwater was 9.5 knots (17.6 km/h; 10.9 mph). The Bellones carried enough fuel oil to give them a surface endurance of 1,859 nautical miles (3,443 km; 2,139 mi) at 12 knots (22 km/h; 14 mph). Their designed submerged endurance was 100 nmi (190 km; 120 mi) at 5 knots (9.3 km/h; 5.8 mph).

The Bellone-class boats were armed with a total of eight 450-millimeter (17.7 in) torpedoes. Two of these were positioned in the bow in internal tubes angled outwards 5° 45'. Four other were located in external rotating torpedo launchers, two on each broadside that could traverse 100–120 degrees to the side of the boats. Two more torpedoes were located in external launchers at the stern angled 5° 10' outwards. The boats were also equipped with a 75 mm (3 in) Mle 1897G deck gun aft of the conning tower.

== Construction and career ==
Hermione was ordered on 3 October 1912 and was laid down at the Arsenal de Toulon on 14 April 1913. She was launched on 15 March 1917 and commissioned on 27 April 1918.

== Bibliography ==
- Couhat, Jean Labayle (1974). French Warships of World War I. London: Ian Allan. ISBN 0-7110-0445-5.
- Garier, Gérard (2002). A l'épreuve de la Grande Guerre. L'odyssée technique et humaine du sous-marin en France (in French). Vol. 3–2. Bourg-en-Bresse, France: Marines édition. ISBN 2-909675-81-5.
- Garier, Gérard (2000). Des Clorinde (1912-1916) aux Diane (1912–1917). L'odyssée technique et humaine du sous-marin en France (in French). Vol. 3–1. Bourg-en-Bresse, France: Marines édition. ISBN 2-909675-54-8.
- Roberts, Stephen S. (2021). French Warships in the Age of Steam 1859–1914: Design, Construction, Careers and Fates. Barnsley, UK: Seaforth Publishing. ISBN 978-1-5267-4533-0.
- Roche, Jean-Michel (2005). Dictionnaire des bâtiments de la flotte de guerre française de Colbert à nos jours 2, 1870 - 2006. Toulon: Roche. ISBN 978-2-9525917-0-6. OCLC 165892922.
- Smigielski, Adam (1985). "France". In Gray, Randal (ed.). Conway's All the World's Fighting Ships 1906–1921. Annapolis, Maryland: Naval Institute Press. pp. 190–220. ISBN 0-87021-907-3.
