= French ship Astrée =

A number of ships of the French Navy have borne the name Astrée in honour of Astraea in Greek mythology.

== Ships named Astrée ==
- Astrée (1707), a 24-gun frigate
- Astrée (1728), a 30-gun frigate.
- Astrée (1778), a 28-gun corvette.
- Astrée (1780), a 40-gun Nymphe-class frigate.
- Astrée (1809), a 44-gun frigate.
- Astrée (1820), a 46-gun frigate.
- Astrée (1859), a sail and steam frigate.
- Astrée (1915), an Amphitrite-class submarine.
- Astrée (Q200), an Aurore-class submarine.
Ships of the French Navy named Astrée
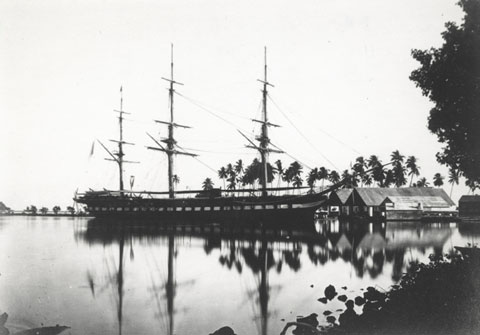
Astrée (1859)

== See also ==
- HMS Astraea

== Notes and references ==
=== Bibliography ===
- Roche, Jean-Michel (2005). Dictionnaire des bâtiments de la flotte de guerre française de Colbert à nos jours. Vol. 1. Group Retozel-Maury Millau. pp. 53–54. ISBN 978-2-9525917-0-6. OCLC 165892922.
- Roche, Jean-Michel (2005). Dictionnaire des bâtiments de la flotte de guerre française de Colbert à nos jours. Vol. 2. Group Retozel-Maury Millau. ISBN 978-2-9525917-0-6. OCLC 165892922.
