= French submarine Diane (1916) =

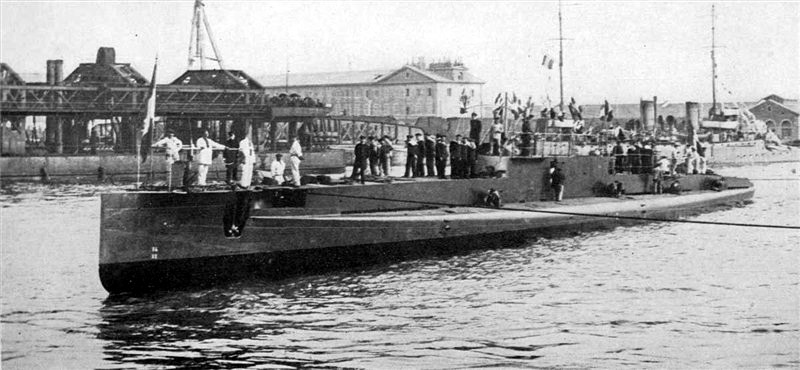
- Diane in 1918

History

France
- Name: Diane
- Ordered: 12 November 1912
- Builder: Arsenal de Cherbourg
- Laid down: 16 March 1913
- Launched: 30 September 1916
- Commissioned: 31 March 1917
- Identification: Budget number: Q107
- Fate: Sunk by explosion, 11 February 1918

General characteristics
- Class & type: Diane-class submarine
- Displacement: 673 t (662 long tons) (surfaced); 901 t (887 long tons) (submerged)
- Length: 68 m (223 ft 1 in) (o/a)
- Beam: 5.53 m (18 ft 2 in) (deep)
- Draft: 3.56 m (11 ft 8 in)
- Installed power: 2 × 800 PS (590 kW; 790 hp) diesel engines; 2 × 700 PS (510 kW; 690 hp) electric motors
- Propulsion: 2 shafts
- Speed: 15 knots (28 km/h; 17 mph) (surfaced); 11.5 knots (21.3 km/h; 13.2 mph) (submerged)
- Range: 2,500 nmi (4,600 km; 2,900 mi) at 10 knots (19 km/h; 12 mph) (surfaced); 100 nmi (190 km; 120 mi) at 5 knots (9.3 km/h; 5.8 mph) (submerged)
- Complement: 34 crew
- Armament: 2 × internal bow 450 mm (17.7 in) torpedo tubes; 2 × external bow 450 mm torpedo tubes; 2 × external stern 450 mm torpedo tubes; 4 × single external 450 mm rotating torpedo launchers

The French submarine Diane was the name boat of her class of two submarines built for the French Navy during World War I. Completed in 1917, the boat suffered an internal explosion in the Bay of Biscay off La Pallice, France, and sank with the loss of her entire crew of 43 in February 1918.

== Design and description ==
The Diane class was built as part of the French Navy's 1912 building program as scaled down versions of Gustave Zédé adapted to use diesel engines. The boats displaced 673 metric tons (662 long tons) surfaced and 900 metric tons (890 long tons) submerged. They had an overall length of 68 meters (223 ft 1 in), a beam of 5.53 meters (18 ft 2 in), and a draft of 3.56 meters (11 ft 8 in). Their crew numbered 34 officers and crewmen.

For surface running, the Diane-class boats were powered by two diesel engines, each driving one propeller shaft. The engines for Diane had been ordered from Chaléassière in 1913, but the company proved unable to deliver them in a timely manner and a pair of Vickers eight-cylinder, four-cycle 800 bhp (811 PS; 597 kW) engines had to be purchased from Britain in 1915. This reduced the boat's speed from the designed 17 knots (31 km/h; 20 mph) to 15 knots (28 km/h; 17 mph). When submerged each shaft was driven by a 700-metric-horsepower (690 bhp; 515 kW) electric motor. The designed speed underwater was 11.5 knots (21.3 km/h; 13.2 mph), but the boats only reached 11 knots (20 km/h; 13 mph) during their sea trials. The Dianes had a maximum fuel capacity of 36.6 t (36 long tons) which gave them a surface endurance of 2,500 nautical miles (4,600 km; 2,900 mi) at 10 knots (19 km/h; 12 mph). Their designed submerged endurance was 130 nmi (240 km; 150 mi) at 5 knots (9.3 km/h; 5.8 mph), but sea trials showed that it fell short of that figure at 110 nmi (200 km; 130 mi).

The Diane class was armed with a total of ten 450-millimeter (17.7 in) torpedoes. Four of these were positioned in the bow; two in internal torpedo tubes in the bow angled outwards three and a half degrees and two in external tubes above them angled outwards nine degrees. Four more were located in four external rotating launchers amidships, two on each broadside; one pair each fore and aft of the conning tower that could traverse 130 degrees to the side of the boats. The last pair were in external tubes in the stern aimed directly aft. While the boats were under construction in 1915 a 75 mm (3 in) Mle 1897 gun with high-angle capacity was ordered to be installed aft of the conning tower. Daphné is known to have received one, but it is uncertain if Diane did.

== Bibliography ==
- Couhat, Jean Labayle (1974). French Warships of World War I. London: Ian Allan. ISBN 0-7110-0445-5.
- Garier, Gérard (2002). A l'épreuve de la Grande Guerre. L'odyssée technique et humaine du sous-marin en France (in French). Vol. 3–2. Bourg-en-Bresse, France: Marines édition. ISBN 2-909675-81-5.
- Garier, Gérard (2000). Des Clorinde (1912-1916) aux Diane (1912–1917). L'odyssée technique et humaine du sous-marin en France (in French). Vol. 3–1. Bourg-en-Bresse, France: Marines édition. ISBN 2-909675-54-8.
- Roberts, Stephen S. (2021). French Warships in the Age of Steam 1859–1914: Design, Construction, Careers and Fates. Barnsley, UK: Seaforth Publishing. ISBN 978-1-5267-4533-0.
- Roche, Jean-Michel (2005). Dictionnaire des bâtiments de la flotte de guerre française de Colbert à nos jours 2, 1870 - 2006. Toulon: Roche. ISBN 978-2-9525917-0-6. OCLC 165892922.
- Smigielski, Adam (1985). "France". In Gray, Randal (ed.). Conway's All the World's Fighting Ships 1906–1921. Annapolis, Maryland: Naval Institute Press. pp. 190–220. ISBN 0-87021-907-3.
