= French submarine Astrée (1915) =

French Amphitrite-class submarine

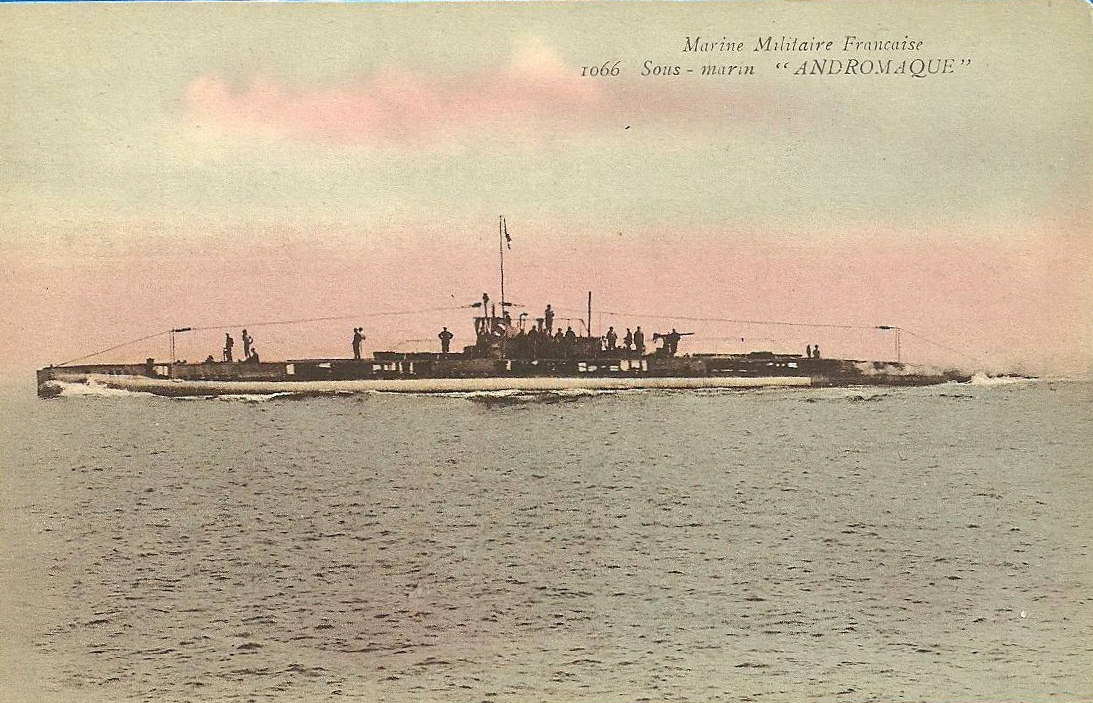
- A colorized postcard of sister ship Andromaque

History

France
- Name: Astrée
- Ordered: 8 January 1912
- Builder: Arsenal de Rochefort
- Laid down: 25 November 1912
- Launched: 6 December 1915
- Commissioned: 11 June 1918
- Stricken: 9 November 1928
- Identification: Budget number: Q95
- Fate: Sold for scrap, 26 November 1930

General characteristics (as built)
- Class & type: Amphitrite-class submarine
- Displacement: 452 t (445 long tons) (surfaced); 609 t (599 long tons) (submerged)
- Length: 54 m (177 ft 2 in) (p/p)
- Beam: 5.83 m (19 ft 2 in) (deep)
- Draft: 3.46 m (11 ft 4 in)
- Installed power: 2 × 400 PS (290 kW; 390 hp) diesel engines; 2 × 350 PS (260 kW; 350 hp) electric motors
- Propulsion: 2 shafts
- Speed: 12–13 knots (22–24 km/h; 14–15 mph) (surfaced); 9.5 knots (17.6 km/h; 10.9 mph) (submerged)
- Range: 1,747 nmi (3,235 km; 2,010 mi) at 7.5 knots (13.9 km/h; 8.6 mph) (surfaced); 108 nmi (200 km; 124 mi) at 4 knots (7.4 km/h; 4.6 mph) (submerged)
- Complement: 29
- Armament: 2 × bow 450 mm (17.7 in) external torpedo tubes; 10 × mine tubes for 10 mines

The French submarine Astrée was one of eight Amphitrite-class submarines built for the French Navy during the 1910s and completed during World War I. She was converted into a minelayer while under construction and completed in 1918. The boat saw little action during her deployment to the Adriatic Sea before the end of the war.

== Design and description ==
The Amphitrite class was built as part of the French Navy's 1909 building program, intended as improved versions of the Clorinde class. Astrée and her sister Amarante were modified while building into minelayers. The minelayers displaced 452 metric tons (445 long tons) surfaced and 609 t (599 long tons) submerged. They had a length between perpendiculars of 54 meters (177 ft 2 in), a beam of 5.83 meters (19 ft 2 in), and a draft of 3.46 meters (11 ft 4 in). The crew of the boats numbered 29 officers and crewmen.

For surface running, the minelayers were powered by a pair of two-cycle diesel engines, each driving one propeller shaft. The MAN-Loire engines were intended to produce a total of 1,300 metric horsepower (1,282 bhp; 956 kW), but were generally only capable of about 800 PS (789 bhp; 588 kW){{}}. During Astrée's sea trials on 28 March 1918, her eight-cylinder engines only produced 846 PS (834 bhp; 622 kW), enough for a speed of 12 knots (22 km/h; 14 mph) rather than the designed 15 knots (28 km/h; 17 mph). The boats were generally capable of 12–13 knots (22–24 km/h; 14–15 mph) on the surface in service. When submerged each shaft was driven by a 700-metric-horsepower (690 bhp; 515 kW) electric motor. The designed speed underwater was 9.5 knots (17.6 km/h; 10.9 mph) although Astrée only reached a speed of 7.9 knots (14.6 km/h; 9.1 mph) from 624 PS (615 bhp; 459 kW) during her trials on 5 April. The minelayers carried enough kerosene to give them a surface endurance of 1,747 nautical miles (3,235 km; 2,010 mi) at 7.5 knots (13.9 km/h; 8.6 mph). Their submerged endurance was 108 nmi (200 km; 124 mi) at 4 knots (7.4 km/h; 4.6 mph).

Astrée and her sister were armed with two external bow 450-millimeter (17.7 in) torpedo tubes. Astrée's tubes were angled outwards 6° 34'. The pair were equipped with 10 vertical mine tubes, each holding one mine.

== Construction and career ==
Astrée was ordered on 8 January 1912 and was laid down at the Arsenal de Rochefort on 6 December. She was launched on 6 December 1915 and commissioned on 11 June 1918. The boat deployed to the Adriatic a few months before the end of the war, but engine problems largely kept her in port, which later caused corrosion problems with her ballast tanks from the inactivity.

== Bibliography ==
- Couhat, Jean Labayle (1974). French Warships of World War I. London: Ian Allan. ISBN 0-7110-0445-5.
- Garier, Gérard (2002). A l'épreuve de la Grande Guerre. L'odyssée technique et humaine du sous-marin en France (in French). Vol. 3–2. Bourg-en-Bresse, France: Marines édition. ISBN 2-909675-81-5.
- Garier, Gérard (2000). Des Clorinde (1912-1916) aux Diane (1912–1917). L'odyssée technique et humaine du sous-marin en France (in French). Vol. 3–1. Bourg-en-Bresse, France: Marines édition. ISBN 2-909675-54-8.
- Roberts, Stephen S. (2021). French Warships in the Age of Steam 1859–1914: Design, Construction, Careers and Fates. Barnsley, UK: Seaforth Publishing. ISBN 978-1-5267-4533-0.
- Roche, Jean-Michel (2005). Dictionnaire des bâtiments de la flotte de guerre française de Colbert à nos jours 2, 1870 - 2006. Toulon: Roche. ISBN 978-2-9525917-0-6. OCLC 165892922.
- Smigielski, Adam (1985). "France". In Gray, Randal (ed.). Conway's All the World's Fighting Ships 1906–1921. Annapolis, Maryland: Naval Institute Press. pp. 190–220. ISBN 0-87021-907-3.
