= French submarine Amphitrite (1914) =

Lead ship of France's Amphitrite-class submarines

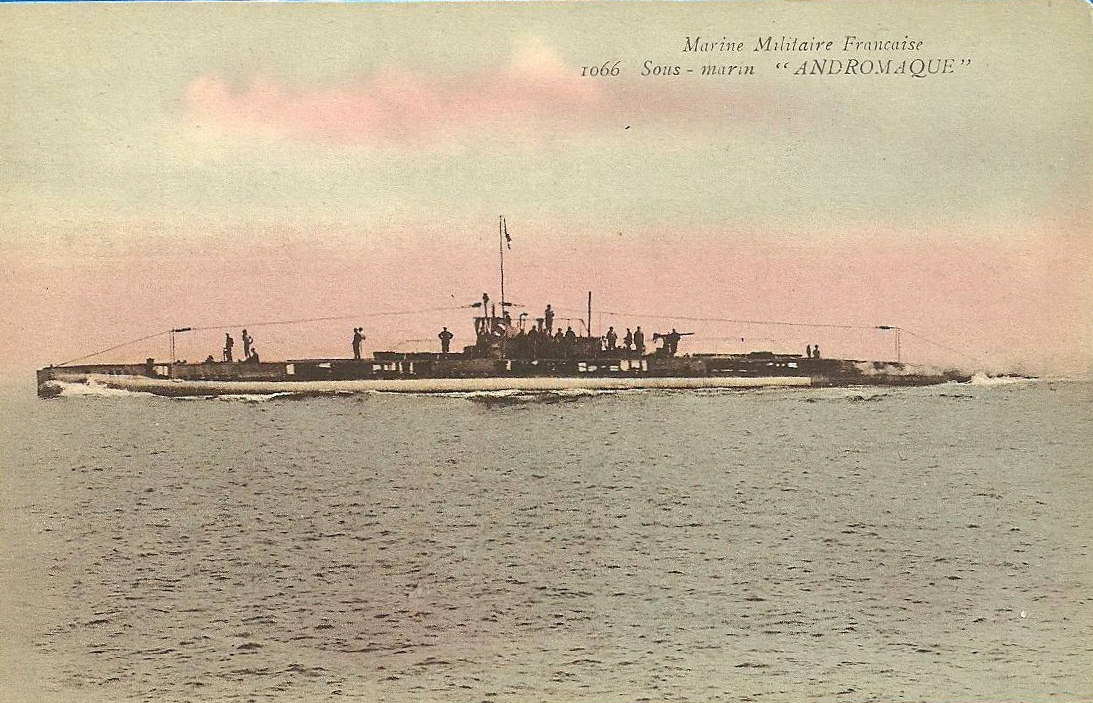
- A colorized postcard of sister ship Andromaque

History

France
- Name: Amphitrite
- Ordered: 8 January 1912
- Builder: Arsenal de Rochefort
- Laid down: 25 November 1912
- Launched: 9 June 1914
- Commissioned: 6 February 1918
- Renamed: Amphitrite II, 20 April 1928
- Stricken: 27 August 1935
- Identification: Budget number: Q94
- Fate: Sold for scrap, 14 May 1936

General characteristics (as built)
- Class & type: Amphitrite-class submarine
- Displacement: 418 t (411 long tons) (surfaced); 614 t (604 long tons) (submerged)
- Length: 54 m (177 ft 2 in) (p/p)
- Beam: 5.41 m (17 ft 9 in) (deep)
- Draft: 3.46 m (11 ft 4 in)
- Installed power: 2 × 400 PS (290 kW; 390 hp) diesel engines; 2 × 350 PS (260 kW; 350 hp) electric motors
- Propulsion: 2 shafts
- Speed: 12–13 knots (22–24 km/h; 14–15 mph) (surfaced); 9.5 knots (17.6 km/h; 10.9 mph) (submerged)
- Range: 785 nmi (1,454 km; 903 mi) at 13 knots (24 km/h; 15 mph) (surfaced); 100 nmi (190 km; 120 mi) at 5 knots (9.3 km/h; 5.8 mph) (submerged)
- Complement: 27
- Armament: 2 × bow 450 mm (17.7 in) external torpedo launchers or torpedo tubes; 6 × single 450 mm Drzewiecki drop collars; 1 × 47 mm (1.9 in) Hotchkiss deck gun

Amphitrite was the lead boat of her class of eight submarines built for the French Navy during the 1910s and completed during World War I. Completed in 1918, she played only a minor role during the war and was sold for scrap in 1936.

== Design and description ==
The Amphitrite-class boats were built as improved versions of the Clorinde class. They displaced 418 metric tons (411 long tons) surfaced and 614 t (604 long tons) submerged. They had a length between perpendiculars of 54 meters (177 ft 2 in), a beam of 5.41 meters (17 ft 9 in), and a draft of 3.46 meters (11 ft 4 in). The crew numbered 27 officers and crewmen.

For surface running, the Amphitrite class was powered by a pair of two-cycle diesel engines provided by three different manufacturers, each driving one propeller shaft. Amphitrite was equipped with six-cylinder Chaléassière engines that were intended to produce a total of 1,300 metric horsepower (1,282 bhp; 956 kW), but only produced 615 PS (607 bhp; 452 kW) during her sea trials on 16 November 1915, enough for a speed of 12.7 knots (23.5 km/h; 14.6 mph) rather than the designed 15 knots (28 km/h; 17 mph). The engines were generally capable of 800 PS (789 bhp; 588 kW), enough for a speed of 12–13 knots (22–24 km/h; 14–15 mph) in service. After a lengthy rebuild, the engines produced 1,170 PS (1,154 bhp; 861 kW) at 90% power during another set of trials on 15 June 1917 and gave Amphitrite a speed of 14.56 knots (26.97 km/h; 16.76 mph). When submerged each shaft was driven by a 700-metric-horsepower (690 bhp; 515 kW) electric motor. The designed speed underwater was 9.5 knots (17.6 km/h; 10.9 mph). The Amphitrites had a maximum fuel capacity of 12 t (12 long tons) of kerosene which gave them a surface endurance of 785 nautical miles (1,454 km; 903 mi) at 13 knots (24 km/h; 15 mph). Their designed submerged endurance was 100 nmi (190 km; 120 mi) at 5 knots (9.3 km/h; 5.8 mph).

The Amphitrite-class boats were armed with a total of eight 450-millimeter (17.7 in) torpedoes. Two of these were positioned in the bow in external tubes angled outwards 4° 25'. The other six were located in external rotating Drzewiecki drop collars, three on each broadside that could traverse 100 degrees to the side of the boats. The boats were also equipped with a 47 mm (1.9 in) Mle 1885-1915 gun aft of the conning tower.

== Bibliography ==
- Couhat, Jean Labayle (1974). French Warships of World War I. London: Ian Allan. ISBN 0-7110-0445-5.
- Garier, Gérard (2002). A l'épreuve de la Grande Guerre. L'odyssée technique et humaine du sous-marin en France (in French). Vol. 3–2. Bourg-en-Bresse, France: Marines édition. ISBN 2-909675-81-5.
- Garier, Gérard (2000). Des Clorinde (1912-1916) aux Diane (1912–1917). L'odyssée technique et humaine du sous-marin en France (in French). Vol. 3–1. Bourg-en-Bresse, France: Marines édition. ISBN 2-909675-54-8.
- Roberts, Stephen S. (2021). French Warships in the Age of Steam 1859–1914: Design, Construction, Careers and Fates. Barnsley, UK: Seaforth Publishing. ISBN 978-1-5267-4533-0.
- Roche, Jean-Michel (2005). Dictionnaire des bâtiments de la flotte de guerre française de Colbert à nos jours 2, 1870 - 2006. Toulon: Roche. ISBN 978-2-9525917-0-6. OCLC 165892922.
- Smigielski, Adam (1985). "France". In Gray, Randal (ed.). Conway's All the World's Fighting Ships 1906–1921. Annapolis, Maryland: Naval Institute Press. pp. 190–220. ISBN 0-87021-907-3.
