= Q99 (New York City bus) =

Former bus route in Queens, New York

q99
- Jamaica Link

Overview
- System: MTA Regional Bus Operations
- Operator: New York City Transit
- Began service: March 12, 1989
- Ended service: September 9, 1990

Route
- Locale: Queens, New York, U.S.
- Communities served: Jamaica
- Start: Jamaica –Jamaica Center–Parsons/Archer subway station,
- Via: Archer Avenue, Merrick Boulevard, 168th Street
- End: Jamaica –169th Street subway station

The Q99 bus route constituted a public transit line in Queens, New York City, running as a shuttle between the New York City Subway's Jamaica Center–Parsons/Archer and 169th Street stations. The route operated between 1989 and 1990 as a pilot route. The route was created as part of a settlement with the local Chamber of Commerce. Due to low ridership the route was discontinued. This route was operated under the New York City Transit brand.

== Route description and service ==
The Q99 route started at the Jamaica Center–Parsons/Archer subway station and bus terminal. From there service went east on Archer Avenue, north on 168th Street, east on 88th Avenue, before turning north on 169th Street. Buses then turned west onto Hillside Avenue to reach the terminal at the 169th Street subway station. At the terminal, transfers were available to many bus routes. Buses returning to Jamaica Center turned south on Merrick Boulevard, passing into the 165th Street Bus Terminal and back onto Merrick Boulevard, before heading west on Archer Avenue, north on 153rd Street, west on Jamaica Avenue, south on 150th Street, before turning east on Archer Avenue to reach the terminal.

Service was operated between 7 a.m. and 9 p.m. on weekdays, between 8 a.m. and 8 p.m. on Saturdays, and between 9 a.m. and 6 p.m. on Sundays. Service ran every 15 minutes on weekdays and Saturdays, and every 20 minutes on Sundays.

== History ==
On December 11, 1988, in coordination with the opening of the Archer Avenue lines, the Metropolitan Transportation Authority (MTA) rerouted buses along Merrick Boulevard from terminating at the 169th Street station and running via the 165th Street Bus Terminal to terminating at the new Jamaica Center–Parsons/Archer station. Merchants near the 169th Street station lost significant business with the rerouting of the bus routes, and, in response, the Jamaica Chamber of Commerce sued the MTA to have the bus route changes reversed. After the two parties stated that they believed an agreement was being neared, State Supreme Court Justice Alan LeVine agreed to postpone a hearing set for March 3, 1989.

On March 12, 1989, the MTA began operating the Q99 route on a trial basis for at least one-year as part of a proposed settlement agreement with the Chamber. It was hoped that the route would get Merrick Boulevard bus riders to patronize the businesses near 169th Street. The route would provide a free transfer between the 169th Street and Jamaica Center subway stations, and the Archer Avenue and Hillside Avenue bus routes.

The settlement was formally agreed to on March 15, 1989. Other elements of the deal included turning Archer Avenue and Jamaica Avenue into a one-way pair as a strategy to keep buses running past the shops, extending the Q76 and Q77 from 179th Street and Hillside Avenue to the 165th Street Bus Terminal in September, and extending some Green Bus Lines routes to the 165th Street Bus Terminal. While this change was expected to take place within several weeks, the Q6, Q8, Q9, Q9A, and Q41 buses were extended to the 165th Street Bus Terminal on October 30, 1989.

The modification of these two streets to a one-way pair required buses to do difficult turns, costing up to $1 million in delays and doubling bus accidents in the area. The Jamaica Chamber of Commerce reported that 14 new stores opened since the change, and the DOT said that it liked the change, a review of which was due in April 1991. The bus route duplicated existing service and had extremely low ridership, with an average of only four passengers per trip. The fares only covered 7% of the route's cost, well below the MTA Board's guidelines of 68%.

As a result, the New York City Transit Authority held a public hearing on June 25, 1990, to hear comments about its plan to discontinue service on the route. Five riders attended the hearing and spoke out against the change, and a TA official stated that "Those were probably all of its riders." The Q17 had already connected the Merrick Boulevard corridor and the Hillside Avenue corridor, while the Q30 and Q31 had connected the Archer Avenue Line with the Hillside Avenue corridor. The Q17 already had the transfer privileges that the Q99 had. On August 17, 1990, the Metropolitan Transportation Authority Board's Transit Authority Committee extended these transfer privileges to the Q30 and Q31. A count completed in summer 1990 found that 212 riders used the Q99's 53 trips, about four riders per trip. Many of these riders were students with discount passes. Service was discontinued on September 9, 1990, because it was, in the words of Norman Silverman, the TA's director of surface transit planning, "a bus with no riders." He did not think that the route would succeed. The bus' operation cost $420,000, or $280,000 a year. The route operated for 18 months, twice the length of typical TA experimental routes, and Sid Davidoff, who lobbied for the bus' creation on behalf of the Jamaica Chamber of Commerce, stated that it never asked that it be kept for 18 months.

== See also ==
- Q74 (New York City bus, 1940–2010), another discontinued Queens bus route
