= Diane-class submarine (1916) =

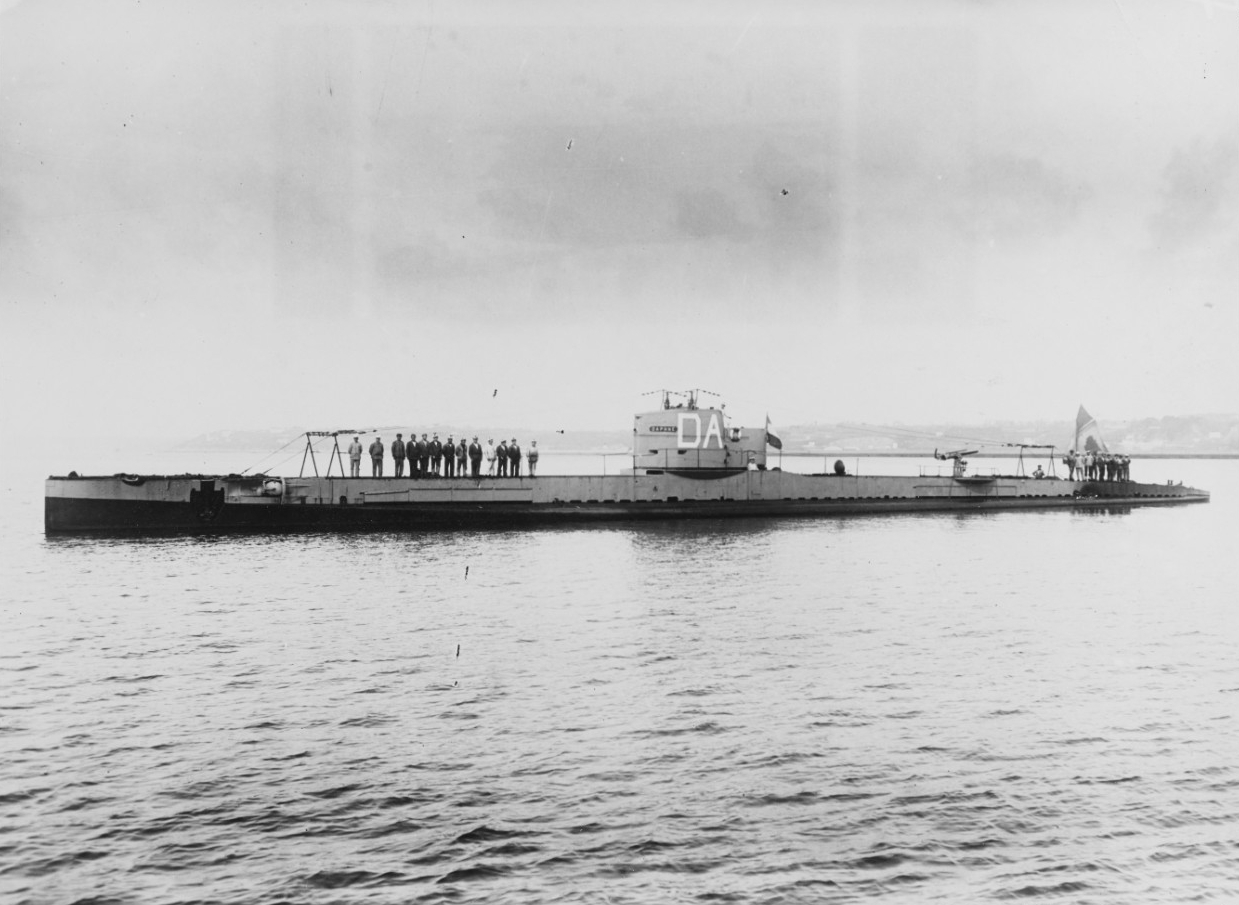
- Daphné at anchor, 1920s

Class overview
- Name: Diane
- Operators: French Navy
- Preceded by: Bellone class
- Succeeded by: Dupuy de Lôme class
- Built: 1913–17
- In service: 1916–35
- Completed: 2
- Lost: 1
- Scrapped: 1

General characteristics
- Type: Submarine
- Displacement: 673 t (662 long tons) (surfaced); 901 t (887 long tons) (submerged)
- Length: 68 m (223 ft 1 in) (o/a)
- Beam: 5.53 m (18 ft 2 in) (deep)
- Draft: 3.56 m (11 ft 8 in)
- Installed power: 2 × 800–820 PS (590–600 kW; 790–810 hp) diesel engines; 2 × 700 PS (510 kW; 690 hp) electric motors
- Propulsion: 2 shafts
- Speed: 15 knots (28 km/h; 17 mph) (surfaced); 11.5 knots (21.3 km/h; 13.2 mph) (submerged)
- Range: 2,500 nmi (4,600 km; 2,900 mi) at 10 knots (19 km/h; 12 mph) (surfaced); 100 nmi (190 km; 120 mi) at 5 knots (9.3 km/h; 5.8 mph) (submerged)
- Complement: 34 crew
- Armament: 2 × internal bow 450 mm (17.7 in) torpedo tubes; 2 × external bow 450 mm torpedo tubes; 2 × external stern 450 mm torpedo tubes; 4 × single external 450 mm rotating torpedo launchers; 1 × single 75 mm (3 in) deck gun (Daphné only)

The Diane class consisted of a pair of submarines built for the French Navy during World War I. Completed in 1916–1917 the boats played a limited role in the war. Diane sank with the loss of all hands in 1918, but her sister Daphné survived the war. She was sold for scrap in 1936.

== Design and description ==
The Diane class was built as part of the French Navy's 1912 building program; Naval constructor Jean Simonot was unhappy that his double-hull design for the submarine Gustave Zédé had been modified to use steam engines rather than the diesel engines that he had specified and proposed a version of his design scaled down by a factor of 0.92, using the same smaller diesels as the submarine Gorgone. The boats displaced 673 metric tons (662 long tons) surfaced and 900 metric tons (890 long tons) submerged. They had an overall length of 68 meters (223 ft 1 in), a beam of 5.53 meters (18 ft 2 in), and a draft of 3.56 meters (11 ft 8 in). Their crew numbered 34 officers and crewmen.

For surface running, the Diane-class boats were powered by two diesel engines, each driving one propeller shaft. The Sulzer two-cycle engines in Daphné were designed to produce a total of 1,800 metric horsepower (1,775 bhp; 1,324 kW), but proved to be unreliable at that rating and output was restricted to 1,640 PS (1,618 bhp; 1,206 kW). This reduced the boat's speed from the designed 17 knots (31 km/h; 20 mph) to 15 knots (28 km/h; 17 mph). The engines for Diane had been ordered from Chaléassière in 1913, but the company proved unable to deliver them in a timely manner and a pair of Vickers eight-cylinder, four-cycle 800 bhp (811 PS; 597 kW) engines had to be purchased from Britain in 1915. When submerged each shaft was driven by a 700-metric-horsepower (690 bhp; 515 kW) electric motor. The designed speed underwater was 11.5 knots (21.3 km/h; 13.2 mph), but the boats only reached 11 knots (20 km/h; 13 mph) during their sea trials. The Dianes had a maximum fuel capacity of 36.6 t (36 long tons) which gave them a surface endurance of 2,500 nautical miles (4,600 km; 2,900 mi) at 10 knots (19 km/h; 12 mph). Their designed submerged endurance was 130 nmi (240 km; 150 mi) at 5 knots (9.3 km/h; 5.8 mph), but sea trials showed that it fell short of that figure at 110 nmi (200 km; 130 mi).

The Diane class was armed with a total of ten 450-millimeter (17.7 in) torpedoes. Four of these were positioned in the bow; two in internal torpedo tubes in the bow angled outwards three and a half degrees and two in external tubes above them angled outwards nine degrees. Four more were located in four external rotating launchers amidships, two on each broadside; one pair each fore and aft of the conning tower that could traverse 130 degrees to the side of the boats. The last pair were in external tubes in the stern aimed directly aft. While the boats were under construction in 1915 a 75 mm (3 in) Mle 1897 gun with high-angle capacity was ordered to be installed aft of the conning tower. Daphné is known to have received one, but it is uncertain if Diane did.

== Ships ==
Name	Builder	Laid down	Launched	Completed	Fate
Diane (Q107)	Arsenal de Cherbourg	16 August 1913	30 September 1916	25 July 1917	Lost, 11 February 1918
Daphné (Q108)	Arsenal de Cherbourg	16 August 1913	25 October 1915	22 November 1916	Stricken, 24 July 1935

== Bibliography ==
- Couhat, Jean Labayle (1974). French Warships of World War I. London: Ian Allan. ISBN 0-7110-0445-5.
- Garier, Gérard (2002). A l'épreuve de la Grande Guerre. L'odyssée technique et humaine du sous-marin en France (in French). Vol. 3–2. Bourg-en-Bresse, France: Marines édition. ISBN 2-909675-81-5.
- Garier, Gérard (2000). Des Clorinde (1912-1916) aux Diane (1912–1917). L'odyssée technique et humaine du sous-marin en France (in French). Vol. 3–1. Bourg-en-Bresse, France: Marines édition. ISBN 2-909675-54-8.
- Roberts, Stephen S. (2021). French Warships in the Age of Steam 1859–1914: Design, Construction, Careers and Fates. Barnsley, UK: Seaforth Publishing. ISBN 978-1-5267-4533-0.
- Smigielski, Adam (1985). "France". In Gray, Randal (ed.). Conway's All the World's Fighting Ships 1906–1921. Annapolis, Maryland: Naval Institute Press. pp. 190–220. ISBN 0-87021-907-3.
