= Amphitrite-class submarine =

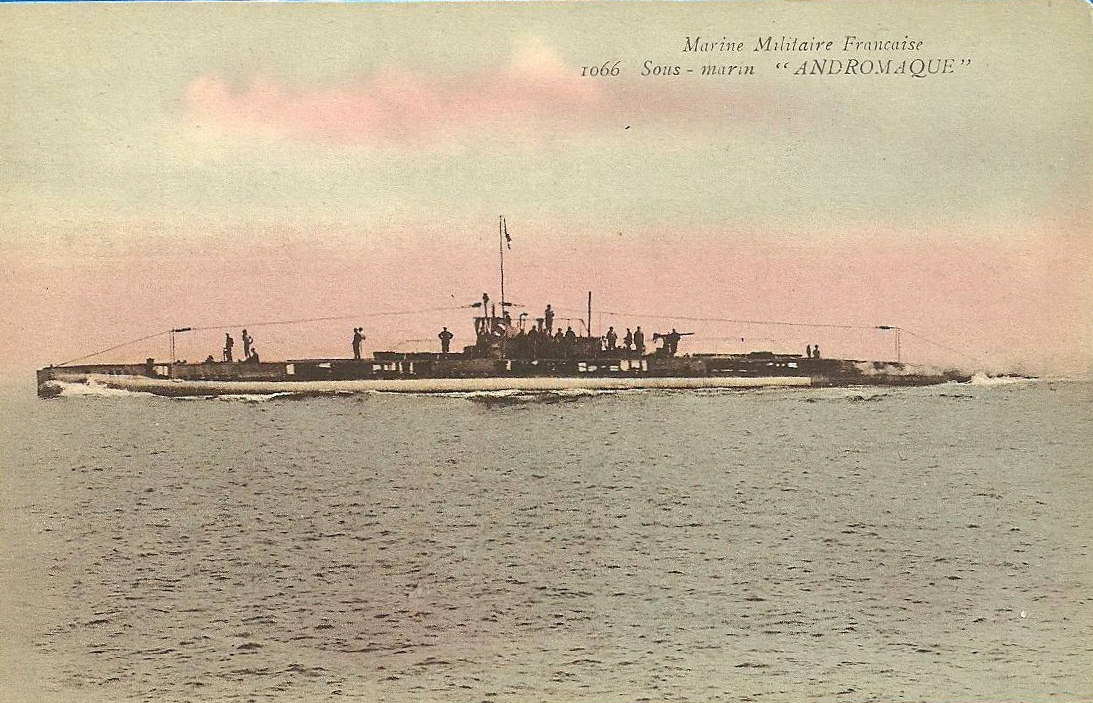
- A colorized postcard of Andromaque

Class overview
- Name: Amphitrite
- Operators: French Navy
- Preceded by: Gustave Zédé class
- Succeeded by: Bellone class
- Built: 1913–18
- In service: 1915–35
- Completed: 8
- Lost: 1
- Scrapped: 7

General characteristics (as built)
- Type: Submarine
- Displacement: 418 t (411 long tons) (surfaced); 614 t (604 long tons) (submerged)
- Length: 54 m (177 ft 2 in) (p/p)
- Beam: 5.41 m (17 ft 9 in) (deep)
- Draft: 3.46 m (11 ft 4 in)
- Installed power: 2 × 400 PS (290 kW; 390 hp) diesel engines; 2 × 350 PS (260 kW; 350 hp) electric motors
- Propulsion: 2 shafts
- Speed: 12–13 knots (22–24 km/h; 14–15 mph) (surfaced); 9.5 knots (17.6 km/h; 10.9 mph) (submerged)
- Range: 785 nmi (1,454 km; 903 mi) at 13 knots (24 km/h; 15 mph) (surfaced); 100 nmi (190 km; 120 mi) at 5 knots (9.3 km/h; 5.8 mph) (submerged)
- Complement: 27
- Armament: 2 × bow 450 mm (17.7 in) external torpedo launchers or torpedo tubes; 6 × single 450 mm Drzewiecki drop collars; 1 × 47 mm (1.9 in) Hotchkiss deck gun; Amarante & Astrée only; 2 × bow 450 mm external torpedo tubes; 10 × vertical mine tubes

The Amphitrite class consisted of eight submarines built for the French Navy just before World War I and completed during the war. The diesel engines of these boats were very unreliable and partially accounted for their lengthy building times. Two of the submarines, Amarante and Astrée, were converted into minelayers before completion.

== Design and description ==
The Amphitrite class was built as part of the French Navy's 1909 building program, intended as improved versions of the Clorinde class. The boats displaced 418 metric tons (411 long tons) surfaced and 614 t (604 long tons) submerged. They had a length between perpendiculars of 54 meters (177 ft 2 in), a beam of 5.41 meters (17 ft 9 in), and a draft of 3.46 meters (11 ft 4 in). The minelayers were slightly wider with a beam of 5.83 m (19 ft 2 in) which increased their displacement to 452 t (445 long tons) on the surface and 609 t (599 long tons). The crew of all the Amphitrites numbered 27 officers and crewmen.

For surface running, the Amphitrite-class boats were powered by a pair of two-cycle diesel engines, each driving one propeller shaft. The engines were provided by three different manufacturers and were intended to produce a total of 1,300 metric horsepower (1,282 bhp; 956 kW), but were generally only capable of 800 PS (789 bhp; 588 kW). During Amphitrite's sea trials on 16 November 1915, her six-cylinder Chaléassière engines only produced 615 PS (607 bhp; 452 kW), enough for a speed of 12.7 knots (23.5 km/h; 14.6 mph) rather than the designed 15 knots (28 km/h; 17 mph). After a lengthy rebuild, the engines produced 1,170 PS (1,154 bhp; 861 kW) at 90% power during another set of trials on 15 June 1917 and gave Amphitrite a speed of 14.56 knots (26.97 km/h; 16.76 mph). The MAN-Loire engines were equally troublesome, but the Schneider engines were generally regarded as the most reliable ones. The boats were generally capable of 12–13 knots (22–24 km/h; 14–15 mph) on the surface in service. When submerged each shaft was driven by a 700-metric-horsepower (690 bhp; 515 kW) electric motor. The designed speed underwater was 9.5 knots (17.6 km/h; 10.9 mph). The Amphitrites had a maximum fuel capacity of 12 t (12 long tons) of kerosene which gave them a surface endurance of 785 nautical miles (1,454 km; 903 mi) at 13 knots (24 km/h; 15 mph). Their designed submerged endurance was 100 nmi (190 km; 120 mi) at 5 knots (9.3 km/h; 5.8 mph).

The Amphitrite-class boats were armed with a total of eight 450-millimeter (17.7 in) torpedoes. Two of these were positioned in the bow in external tubes angled outwards 4° 25'. The other six were located in external rotating Drzewiecki drop collars, three on each broadside that could traverse 100 degrees to the side of the boats. The boats were also equipped with a 47 mm (1.9 in) Mle 1885-1915 gun aft of the conning tower. The minelayers replaced the drop collars with 10 vertical mine tubes, each holding one mine, but retained the bow torpedo tubes, albeit with a greater outward angle.

== Ships ==
Name	Builder	Launched	Completed	Fate
Amphitrite (Q94)	Arsenal de Rochefort	9 June 1914	6 February 1918	stricken, 24 July 1935
Astrée (Q95)	Arsenal de Rochefort	6 December 1915	11 June 1918	stricken, 9 November 1928
Artémis (Q96)	Arsenal de Toulon	14 October 1914	8 May 1916	stricken, 5 May 1927
Aréthuse (Q97)	Arsenal de Toulon	20 April 1916	10 July 1916	stricken, 8 March 1927
Atalante (Q98)	Arsenal de Toulon	15 April 1915	22 December 1915	stricken, 9 June 133
Amarante (Q99)	Arsenal de Toulon	11 November 1915	14 January 1918	stricken, 3 February 1925
Ariane (Q100)	Arsenal de Cherbourg	5 September 1914	20 April 1916	sunk, 19 June 1917
Andromaque (Q101)	Arsenal de Cherbourg	13 February 1915	22 June 1916	stricken, 25 October 1926

== Bibliography ==
- Couhat, Jean Labayle (1974). French Warships of World War I. London: Ian Allan. ISBN 0-7110-0445-5.
- Garier, Gérard (2002). A l'épreuve de la Grande Guerre. L'odyssée technique et humaine du sous-marin en France (in French). Vol. 3–2. Bourg-en-Bresse, France: Marines édition. ISBN 2-909675-81-5.
- Garier, Gérard (2000). Des Clorinde (1912-1916) aux Diane (1912–1917). L'odyssée technique et humaine du sous-marin en France (in French). Vol. 3–1. Bourg-en-Bresse, France: Marines édition. ISBN 2-909675-54-8.
- Roberts, Stephen S. (2021). French Warships in the Age of Steam 1859–1914: Design, Construction, Careers and Fates. Barnsley, UK: Seaforth Publishing. ISBN 978-1-5267-4533-0.
- Roche, Jean-Michel (2005). Dictionnaire des bâtiments de la flotte de guerre française de Colbert à nos jours 2, 1870 - 2006. Toulon: Roche. ISBN 978-2-9525917-0-6. OCLC 165892922.
- Smigielski, Adam (1985). "France". In Gray, Randal (ed.). Conway's All the World's Fighting Ships 1906–1921. Annapolis, Maryland: Naval Institute Press. pp. 190–220. ISBN 0-87021-907-3.
