= French submarine Andromaque (1915) =

French Amphitrite-class submarine

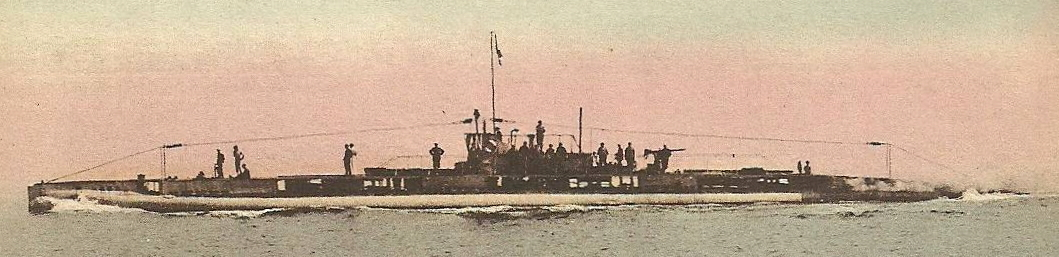
- A colorized postcard of Andromaque

History

France
- Name: Andromaque
- Ordered: 8 January 1912
- Builder: Arsenal de Cherbourg
- Laid down: 23 October 1912
- Launched: 13 February 1915
- Commissioned: 22 June 1916
- Stricken: 25 October 1926
- Identification: Budget number: Q101
- Fate: Sold for scrap, 30 May 1928

General characteristics (as built)
- Class & type: Amphitrite-class submarine
- Displacement: 418 t (411 long tons) (surfaced); 614 t (604 long tons) (submerged)
- Length: 54 m (177 ft 2 in) (p/p)
- Beam: 5.41 m (17 ft 9 in) (deep)
- Draft: 3.46 m (11 ft 4 in)
- Installed power: 2 × 400 PS (290 kW; 390 hp) diesel engines; 2 × 350 PS (260 kW; 350 hp) electric motors
- Propulsion: 2 shafts
- Speed: 12–13 knots (22–24 km/h; 14–15 mph) (surfaced); 9.5 knots (17.6 km/h; 10.9 mph) (submerged)
- Range: 785 nmi (1,454 km; 903 mi) at 13 knots (24 km/h; 15 mph) (surfaced); 100 nmi (190 km; 120 mi) at 5 knots (9.3 km/h; 5.8 mph) (submerged)
- Complement: 27
- Armament: 2 × bow 450 mm (17.7 in) external torpedo launchers or torpedo tubes; 6 × single 450 mm Drzewiecki drop collars; 1 × 47 mm (1.9 in) Hotchkiss deck gun

The French submarine Andromaque was one of eight Amphitrite-class submarines built for the French Navy during the 1910s and completed during World War I. Completed in 1916, she played a minor role during the war and was sold for scrap in 1928.

== Design and description ==
The Amphitrite-class boats were built as improved versions of the Clorinde class. They displaced 418 metric tons (411 long tons) surfaced and 614 t (604 long tons) submerged. They had a length between perpendiculars of 54 meters (177 ft 2 in), a beam of 5.41 meters (17 ft 9 in), and a draft of 3.46 meters (11 ft 4 in). The crew numbered 27 officers and crewmen.

For surface running, the Amphitrite class was powered by a pair of two-cycle diesel engines provided by three different manufacturers, each driving one propeller shaft. Andromaque was equipped with eight-cylinder MAN-Loire engines that were intended to produce a total of 1,300 metric horsepower (1,282 bhp; 956 kW), but only produced 800 PS (789 bhp; 588 kW) in service, enough for a speed of 12–13 knots (22–24 km/h; 14–15 mph) rather than the designed 15 knots (28 km/h; 17 mph). When submerged each shaft was driven by a 700-metric-horsepower (690 bhp; 515 kW) electric motor. The designed speed underwater was 9.5 knots (17.6 km/h; 10.9 mph). The Amphitrites had a maximum fuel capacity of 12 t (12 long tons) of kerosene which gave them a surface endurance of 785 nautical miles (1,454 km; 903 mi) at 13 knots (24 km/h; 15 mph). Their designed submerged endurance was 100 nmi (190 km; 120 mi) at 5 knots (9.3 km/h; 5.8 mph).

The Amphitrite-class boats were armed with a total of eight 450-millimeter (17.7 in) torpedoes. Two of these were positioned in the bow in external tubes angled outwards 4° 25'. The other six were located in external rotating Drzewiecki drop collars, three on each broadside that could traverse 100 degrees to the side of the boats. The boats were also equipped with a 47 mm (1.9 in) Mle 1885-1915 gun aft of the conning tower.

== Construction and career ==
Andromaque was ordered on 8 January 1912 and was laid down at the Arsenal de Cherbourg on 23 October. She was launched on 13 February 1915 and commissioned on 22 June 1916.

== Bibliography ==
- Couhat, Jean Labayle (1974). French Warships of World War I. London: Ian Allan. ISBN 0-7110-0445-5.
- Garier, Gérard (2002). A l'épreuve de la Grande Guerre. L'odyssée technique et humaine du sous-marin en France (in French). Vol. 3–2. Bourg-en-Bresse, France: Marines édition. ISBN 2-909675-81-5.
- Garier, Gérard (2000). Des Clorinde (1912-1916) aux Diane (1912–1917). L'odyssée technique et humaine du sous-marin en France (in French). Vol. 3–1. Bourg-en-Bresse, France: Marines édition. ISBN 2-909675-54-8.
- Roberts, Stephen S. (2021). French Warships in the Age of Steam 1859–1914: Design, Construction, Careers and Fates. Barnsley, UK: Seaforth Publishing. ISBN 978-1-5267-4533-0.
- Roche, Jean-Michel (2005). Dictionnaire des bâtiments de la flotte de guerre française de Colbert à nos jours 2, 1870 - 2006. Toulon: Roche. ISBN 978-2-9525917-0-6. OCLC 165892922.
- Smigielski, Adam (1985). "France". In Gray, Randal (ed.). Conway's All the World's Fighting Ships 1906–1921. Annapolis, Maryland: Naval Institute Press. pp. 190–220. ISBN 0-87021-907-3.
