= List of ship launches in 1912 =

The list of ship launches in 1912 is a chronological list of ships launched in 1912. In cases where no official launching ceremony was held, the date built or completed may be used instead.

Date	Ship	Class and type	Builder	Location	Country	Notes
6 January	Nivôse	Brumaire-class submarine	Arsenal de Cherbourg	Cherbourg	France	For French Navy
10 January	Polarlys	Coastal passenger/cargo steamer	Burmeister & Wain,	Copenhagen	Denmark	For Bergen Steamship Company.
31 January	G9	V1-class torpedo boat	Germaniawerft	Kiel	Germany	For Imperial German Navy.
3 February	Durak Reis	Gunboat	Forges et Chantiers de la Méditerranée	Le Havre	France	For: Ottoman Navy
5 February	España	España-class battleship	SECN	Ferrol	Spain	For Spanish Navy.
7 February	Monte Penedo	General cargo vessel	Howaldswerke	Kiel	Germany	
17 February	Prinzregent Luitpold	Kaiser-class battleship	Germaniawerft	Kiel	Germany	
2 March	Desna	Passenger ship	Harland & Wolff	Belfast	United Kingdom	For Royal Mail Line.
2 March	S14	V1-class torpedo boat	Schichau-Werke	Elbing	Germany	For Imperial German Navy.
12 March	Kjell	2.-class torpedo boat	The Royal Norwegian Navy Shipyard	Horten	Norway	Captured by Germany in 1940, renamed Dragoner and sunk in 1944 by Mosquito fighter bombers
15 March	G10	V1-class torpedo boat	Germaniawerft	Kiel	Germany	For Imperial German Navy.
20 March	Queen Mary	unique battlecruiser	Palmers Shipbuilding and Iron Company	Jarrow	United Kingdom	
23 March	S15	V1-class torpedo boat	Schichau-Werke	Elbing	Germany	For Imperial German Navy.
21 March	Ajax	King George V-class battleship	Scotts Shipyard	Greenock	United Kingdom	
21 March	Tegetthoff	Tegetthoff-class battleship	Stabilimento Tecnico Triestino	Trieste	Austria-Hungary	
30 March	Seydlitz	unique battlecruiser	Blohm + Voss	Hamburg	Germany	For Imperial German Navy
1 April	Hizir Reis	Gunboat	Forges et Chantiers de la Méditerranée	Le Havre	France	For: Ottoman Navy
3 April	West Wales	Cargo ship	Blyth Shipbuilding & Dry Docks Co. Ltd	Blyth	United Kingdom	For West Wales Steamship Co. Ltd.
18 April	Dehorter	Bouclier-class destroyer	Chantiers de Penhoët	Saint-Nazaire	France	
18 April	Montgolfier	Brumaire-class submarine	Arsenal de Rochefort	Rochefort	France	For French Navy
20 April	S16	V1-class torpedo boat	Schichau-Werke	Elbing	Germany	For Imperial German Navy.
23 April	G11	V1-class torpedo boat	Germaniawerft	Kiel	German Empire	For Imperial German Navy.
27 April	König Albert	Kaiser-class battleship	Schichau-Werft	Danzig	Germany	
10 May	Indomito	Indomito-class destroyer	Cantiere Pattison	Naples	Italy	For Regia Marina.
11 May	Harmony	Brig	William Bowes	Whitehaven	United Kingdom	For private owner.
16 May	Darro	Passenger ship	Harland & Wolff	Belfast	United Kingdom	For Royal Mail Line.
18 May	Texas	New York-class battleship	Newport News Shipbuilding	Newport News, Virginia	United States	
18 May	Newton	Brumaire-class submarine	Arsenal de Rochefort	Rochefort	France	For French Navy
18 May	Rouen	Steamship	Forges et Chantiers de la Méditerranée	Le Havre	France	For: Chemins de Fer de l'État Français
23 May	Imperator	Imperator-class ocean liner	AG Vulcan	Hamburg	Germany	For Hamburg America Line.
1 June	Lurcher	Acheron-class destroyer	Yarrow & Company	Scotstoun	United Kingdom	
12 June	Ebani	General cargo vessel	Palmers Shipbuilding and Iron Company Limited	Hebburn	United Kingdom	For British & African Steam Navigation Co. Ltd.
13 June	Coulomb	Bernoullie-class submarine	Arsenal de Toulon	Toulon	France	For French Navy
15 June	Oxfordshire	Cargo liner	Harland & Wolff	Belfast	United Kingdom	For Bibby Line.
15 June	Foucault	Brumaire-class submarine	Arsenal de Cherbourg	Cherbourg	France	For French Navy
18 June	Sheaf Arrow	Cargo ship	Blyth Shipbuilding & Dry Docks Co. Ltd	Blyth	United Kingdom	For Sheaf Arrow Steam Shipping Co. Ltd.
22 June	S17	V1-class torpedo boat	Schichau-Werke	Elbing	Germany	For Imperial German Navy.
28 June	Arago	Brumaire-class submarine	Arsenal de Toulon	Toulon	France	For French Navy
29 June	Drina	Passenger ship	Harland & Wolff	Belfast	United Kingdom	For Royal Mail Line.
12 July	Le Havre	Light ship	Forges et Chantiers de la Méditerranée	Le Havre	France	For: Ponts et Chaussées
15 July	G12	V1-class torpedo boat	Germaniawerft	Kiel	Germany	For Imperial German Navy.
18 July	Curie	Brumaire-class submarine	Arsenal de Toulon	Toulon	France	For French Navy
7 August	Intrepido	Indomito-class destroyer	Cantiere Pattison	Naples	Italy	For Regia Marina.
10 August	S18	V1-class torpedo boat	Schichau-Werke	Elbing	Germany	For Imperial German Navy.
13 August	Thyra Menier	Cargo ship	Blyth Shipbuilding & Dry Docks Co. Ltd	Blyth	United Kingdom	For Donald Steamship Co. Ltd.
14 August	Willochra	Cruise ship	William Beardmore & Co Ltd	Dalmuir	United Kingdom	For Adelaide Steamship Company
15 August	Abosso	Cargo ship	Harland & Wolff	Belfast	United Kingdom	For African Steamship Co.
24 August	Jupiter	Collier	Mare Island Navy Yard	Vallejo, California	United States	Later became USS Langley
29 August	Christopher	Acasta-class destroyer	Hawthorn Leslie	Hebburn	United Kingdom	For Royal Navy.
5 September	Oak	Acheron-class destroyer	Yarrow & Company	Scotstoun	United Kingdom	For Royal Navy.
10 September	Acasta	Acasta-class destroyer	John Brown & Company	Clydebank	United Kingdom	For Royal Navy.
12 September	Bisson	Bisson-class destroyer	Arsenal de Toulon	Toulon	France	For French Navy.
12 September	Ville d'Alger	Steamship	Forges et Chantiers de la Méditerranée	Le Havre	France	For: Cie. Havraise Péninsulaire de Navigation à Vapeur
19 September	Audacious	King George V-class battleship	Cammell Laird	Birkenhead	United Kingdom	
27 September	Le Hève	Light ship	Forges et Chantiers de la Méditerranée	Le Havre	France	For: Ponts et Chaussées (Cap de la Hève)
28 September	Paris	Courbet-class battleship	Forges et Chantiers de la Méditerranée	La Seyne	France	
10 October	Appam	Passenger ship	Harland & Wolff	Belfast	United Kingdom	For British & African Steamship Co.
10 October	Hannington Court	Cargo ship	Sir John Priestman & Co Ltd	Southwick	United Kingdom	For Court Line Ltd
12 October	Euler	Brumaire-class submarine	Arsenal de Cherbourg	Cherbourg	France	For French Navy
12 October	Iron Duke	Iron Duke-class battleship	HM Dockyard	Portsmouth	United Kingdom	
16 October	U-17	Type U 17 submarine	Kaiserliche Werft	Danzig	Germany	Captured and sunk first British merchant vessel to be lost during World War I.
17 October	S19	V1-class torpedo boat	Schichau-Werke	Elbing	Germany	For Imperial German Navy.
24 October	Marlborough	Iron Duke-class battleship	HM Dockyard	Devonport	United Kingdom	
26 October	Inglemoor	Cargo ship	Blyth Shipbuilding & Dry Docks Co. Ltd	Blyth	United Kingdom	For Moor Line Ltd.
30 October	New York	New York-class battleship	New York Navy Yard	Brooklyn, New York	United States	
31 October	Le Verrier	Brumaire-class submarine	Arsenal de Toulon	Toulon	France	For French Navy
7 November	France	Courbet-class battleship	Ateliers et Chantiers de la Loire	Saint-Nazaire	France	
8 November	Cockatrice	Acasta-class destroyer	Hawthorn Leslie	Hebburn	United Kingdom	For Royal Navy.
11 November	Karlsruhe	Karlsruhe-class cruiser	Germaniawerft	Kiel	Germany	
12 November	Rostock	Karlsruhe-class cruiser	Howaldtswerke	Kiel	Germany	
14 November	Achates	Acasta-class destroyer	John Brown & Company	Clydebank	United Kingdom	For Royal Navy.
23 November	Kristianiafjord	Passenger ship	Cammell Laird & Co. Ltd.	Birkenhead	United Kingdom	For Norwegian America Line.
25 November	Amiral Bourgois	Submarine	Arsenal de Rochefort	Rochefort	France	For French Navy
30 November	Prinz Eugen	Tegetthoff-class battleship	Stabilimento Tecnico Triestino	Trieste	Austria-Hungary	
4 December	S20	V1-class torpedo boat	Schichau-Werke	Elbing	Germany	For Imperial German Navy.
11 December	Ceramic	Passenger ship	Harland & Wolff	Belfast	United Kingdom	For White Star Line.
Unknown date	A. G. Prentiss	Small wooden-hulled tug		Kennebunk, Maine	United States	
Unknown date	Alaburn	Steam drifter	Beeching Brothers Ltd.	Great Yarmouth	United Kingdom	For Robert Milburn.
Unknown date	Badenia	Coaster	F Schichau GmbH	Elbling	Germany	For A Kirsten
Unknown date	Barbel	Barge	I. J. Abdela & Mitchell Ltd.	Queensferry	United Kingdom	For Rea Transport Co. Ltd.
Unknown date	Birmingham	Tug	Abdela & Mitchell Ltd.	Brimscombe	United Kingdom	For private owner.
Unknown date	Bitterling	Barge	I. J. Abdela & Mitchell Ltd.	Queensferry	United Kingdom	For Rea Transport Co. Ltd.
Unknown date	Borussia	Coaster	Nüscke & Co	Stettin	Germany	For A Kirsten
Unknown date	Broughton	Sailing ship	I. J. Abdela & Mitchell Ltd.	Queensferry	United Kingdom	For private owner.
Unknown date	Czar	Passenger ship	Barclay, Curle & Co. Ltd.	Glasgow	United Kingdom	For private owner.
Unknown date	Dimboola	Cargo ship	Swan, Hunter & Wigham Richarson Ltd.	Newcastle upon Tyne	United Kingdom	For private owner.
Unknown date	Dollart	Coaster	Stettiner Oderwerke	Stettin	Germany	Bugsier Reederei und Bergungs AG
Unknown date	Fernebo	Cargo ship	Oskarshamn Shipyard	Oskarshamn	Sweden	For Broström Axel & Son
Unknown date	Fire Queen	Fire float	Abdela & Mitchell Ltd.	Brimscombe	United Kingdom	For Lord Mayor & citizens of Cardiff.
Unknown date	Glen Avon	Paddle steamer	Ailsa Shipbuilding Co Ltd.	Troon	United Kingdom	For P. & A. Campbell.
Unknown date	Hispania	Cargo ship	Antwerp Engineering Co Ltd	Hoboken	Belgium	For Svenska Lloyd AB
Unknown date	Jubilee	Tug	I. J. Abdela & Mitchell Ltd.	Queensferry	United Kingdom	For private owner.
Unknown date	L. V. Stoddard	Tanker	Toledo Shipbuilding Company.	Toledo, Ohio	United States	For private owner.
Unknown date	Manoel Thomaz	Sailing ship	I. J. Abdela & Mitchell Ltd.	Queensferry	United Kingdom	For private owner.
Unknown date	Oburn	Steam drifter	Beeching Brothers Ltd.	Great Yarmouth	United Kingdom	For Robert Milburn.
Unknown date	Ocean Plough	Steam drifter	Beeching Brothers Ltd.	Great Yarmouth	United Kingdom	For Bloomfields Ltd.
Unknown date	Ocean Reaper	Steam drifter	Beeching Brothers Ltd.	Great Yarmouth	United Kingdom	For W. J. E. Green Ltd.
Unknown date	Ocean Souvenir	Steam drifter	Beeching Brothers Ltd.	Great Yarmouth	United Kingdom	For Bloomfields Ltd.
Unknown date	Sharpness	Tug	Abdela & Mitchell Ltd.	Brimscombe	United Kingdom	For private owner.
Unknown date	Thomas Beeching	Steam drifter	Beeching Brothers Ltd.	Great Yarmouth	United Kingdom	For Great Yarmouth Steam Drifters Ltd.
Unknown date	Verna & Esther	Patrol vessel		Kennebunk, Maine	United States	Operated as private motorboat from 1912 to 1917; acquired on lease by U.S. Navy for use during World War I; returned to owner in 1918.
Unknown date	Worcester	Tug	Abdela & Mitchell Ltd.	Brimscombe	United Kingdom	For private owner.
Unknown date	No. 3 Newport	Barge	I. J. Abdela & Mitchell Ltd.	Queensferry	United Kingdom	For Rea Transport Co. Ltd.
Unknown date	Swano	Sloop	Brown & Clapson	Barton-upon-Humber	United Kingdom	For Henry Oldridge.
Unknown date	Unnamed	Lighter	I. J. Abdela & Mitchell Ltd.	Queensferry	United Kingdom	For private owner.
Unknown date	Unnamed	Lighter	I. J. Abdela & Mitchell Ltd.	Queensferry	United Kingdom	For private owner.
Unknown date	Unnamed	Lighter	I. J. Abdela & Mitchell Ltd.	Queensferry	United Kingdom	For private owner.
Unknown date	Unnamed	Lighter	I. J. Abdela & Mitchell Ltd.	Queensferry	United Kingdom	For private owner.
Unknown date	Unnamed	Barge	I. J. Abdela & Mitchell Ltd.	Queensferry	United Kingdom	For private owner.
