= Brumaire (disambiguation) =

Brumaire was the second month of the French Republican calendar.

It may also refer to:

- Brumaire-class submarine, a line of French vessels
- French submarine Brumaire (Q60), launched 1911
- Jacqueline Brumaire (1921–2000), French operatic soprano

== See also ==
- Coup of 18 Brumaire, a 1799 military coup by Napoleon Bonaparte
- The Eighteenth Brumaire of Louis Bonaparte, an 1852 essay by Karl Marx
- Bonjour Brumaire, a Canadian indie pop band
