= Q78 =

Q78 may refer to:

- Q78 (New York City bus)
- An-Naba, a surah of the Quran
- French submarine Faraday
