= Q72 =

Q72 may refer to:

- Q72 (New York City bus)
- Al-Jinn, the 72nd surah of the Quran
- French submarine Franklin
