= Q85 =

Q85 may refer to:

- Q85 (New York City bus)
- Al-Burooj, a surah of the Quran
- French submarine Coulomb
