= Q86 =

Q86 may refer to:

- Q86 (New York City bus)
- At-Tariq, a surah of the Quran
- French submarine Arago
