= French submarine Coulomb =

Brumaire-class submarine

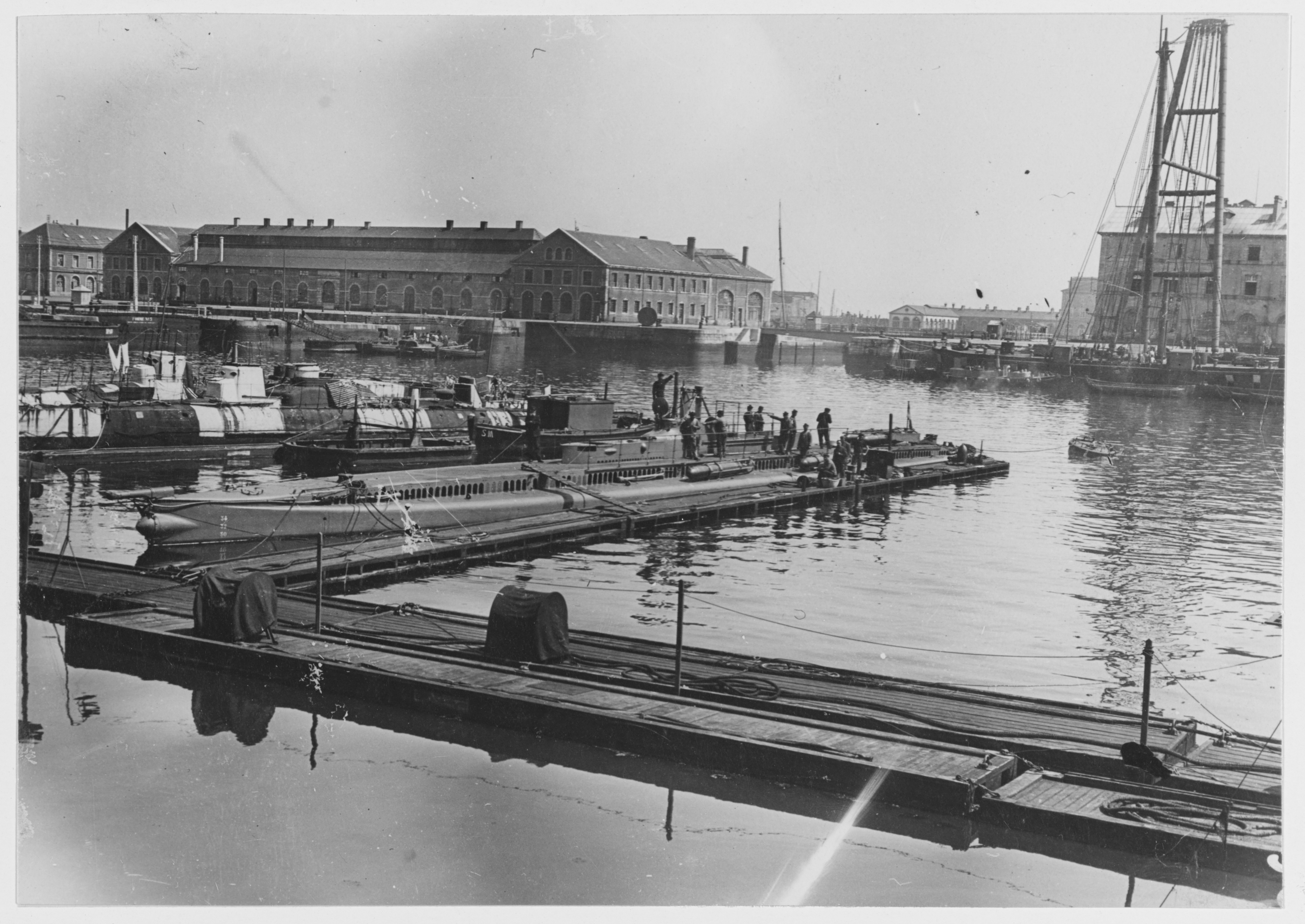
- An unidentified Brumaire-class submarine in Cherbourg

History

France
- Name: Coulomb
- Builder: Arsenal de Toulon
- Launched: 13 June 1912
- Completed: 28 October 1912
- Stricken: 12 November 1919
- Identification: Budget number: Q85
- Fate: Sold for scrap, 25 June 1927

General characteristics (as built)
- Class & type: Brumaire-class submarine
- Displacement: 401 t (395 long tons) (surfaced); 548 t (539 long tons) (submerged)
- Length: 50.75 m (166 ft 6 in) (o/a)
- Beam: 5 m (16 ft 5 in)
- Draft: 3.15 m (10 ft 4 in)
- Installed power: 725 PS (533 kW; 715 bhp) (diesels); 660 PS (490 kW; 650 bhp) (electric motors)
- Propulsion: 2 × shafts; 2 × diesel engines; 2 × electric motors
- Speed: 13 knots (24 km/h; 15 mph) (surfaced); 8.8 knots (16.3 km/h; 10.1 mph) (submerged)
- Range: 2,000 nmi (3,700 km; 2,300 mi) at 9.6 knots (17.8 km/h; 11.0 mph) (surfaced); 84 nmi (156 km; 97 mi) at 5 knots (9.3 km/h; 5.8 mph) (submerged)
- Complement: 29
- Armament: 1 × 450 mm (17.7 in) bow torpedo tube; 1 × twin 450 mm Drzewiecki drop collar; 2 × single 450 mm Drzewiecki drop collars; 2 × single external 450 mm torpedo launchers

Coulomb was one of 16 Brumaire-class submarines built for the French Navy during the first decade of the 20th century. Together with Bernoulli and Joule, she was one of the submarines furthest along in construction when the navy decided to revise the outer hull and superstructure shape of the Brumaires and was completed to the original design.

== Design and description ==
The Brumaire class were built as part of the French Navy's 1906 building program to a double-hull design by Maxime Laubeuf that were diesel-engined versions of the preceding Pluviôse class. Coulomb displaced 401 metric tons (395 long tons) surfaced and 548 metric tons (539 long tons) submerged. She had an overall length of 50.75 meters (166 ft 6 in), a beam of 5 meters (16 ft 5 in), and a draft of 3.15 meters (10 ft 4 in). Her crew numbered 29 officers and crewmen.

For surface running, Coulomb was powered by two diesel engines, each driving one propeller shaft. The engines were designed to produce a total of 840 metric horsepower (829 bhp; 618 kW), but normally only produced 725 PS (715 bhp; 533 kW), which was enough to give the boat a speed of 13 knots (24 km/h; 15 mph). When submerged each shaft was driven by a 330-metric-horsepower (325 bhp; 243 kW) electric motor. The maximum speed underwater was 8.8 knots (16.3 km/h; 10.1 mph). Coulomb had a surface endurance of 2,000 nautical miles (3,700 km; 2,300 mi) at 9.6 knots (17.8 km/h; 11.0 mph) and a submerged endurance of 84 nmi (156 km; 97 mi) at 5 knots (9.3 km/h; 5.8 mph).

The boat was armed with one 450-millimeter (17.7 in) torpedo tube in the bow and 5 external 450 mm torpedo launchers; four of which were positioned on the top of the hull. The two forward ones were fixed outwards at an angle of five degrees. The other launchers were single rotating Drzewiecki drop collars amidships and a twin drop collar to the rear of the superstructure. They could traverse 135 degrees to each side of the boat. One reload was provided for the bow tube. A support for a 37-millimeter (1.5 in) deck gun was ordered to be installed on 29 March 1911, but the gun itself was never fitted.

== Construction and career ==
Coulomb was ordered on 29 October 1906 and was laid down on 17 October 1908 at the Arsenal de Toulon, launched on 13 June 1912 and commissioned on 28 October 1912. Completion was delayed by late deliveries of her engines, the order to remove her bow tube in 1909 and its subsequent reinstatement in 1910.

== Bibliography ==
- Couhat, Jean Labayle (1974). French Warships of World War I. London: Ian Allan. ISBN 0-7110-0445-5.
- Garier, Gérard (2002). A l'épreuve de la Grande Guerre. L'odyssée technique et humaine du sous-marin en France (in French). Vol. 3–2. Bourg-en-Bresse, France: Marines édition. ISBN 2-909675-81-5.
- Garier, Gérard (1998). Des Émeraude (1905-1906) au Charles Brun (1908–1933). L'odyssée technique et humaine du sous-marin en France (in French). Vol. 2. Bourg-en-Bresse, France: Marines édition. ISBN 2-909675-34-3.
- Roberts, Stephen S. (2021). French Warships in the Age of Steam 1859–1914: Design, Construction, Careers and Fates. Barnsley, UK: Seaforth Publishing. ISBN 978-1-5267-4533-0.
- Smigielski, Adam (1985). "France". In Gray, Randal (ed.). Conway's All the World's Fighting Ships 1906–1921. Annapolis, Maryland: Naval Institute Press. pp. 190–220. ISBN 0-87021-907-3.
