= French submarine Volta =

Brumaire-class submarine

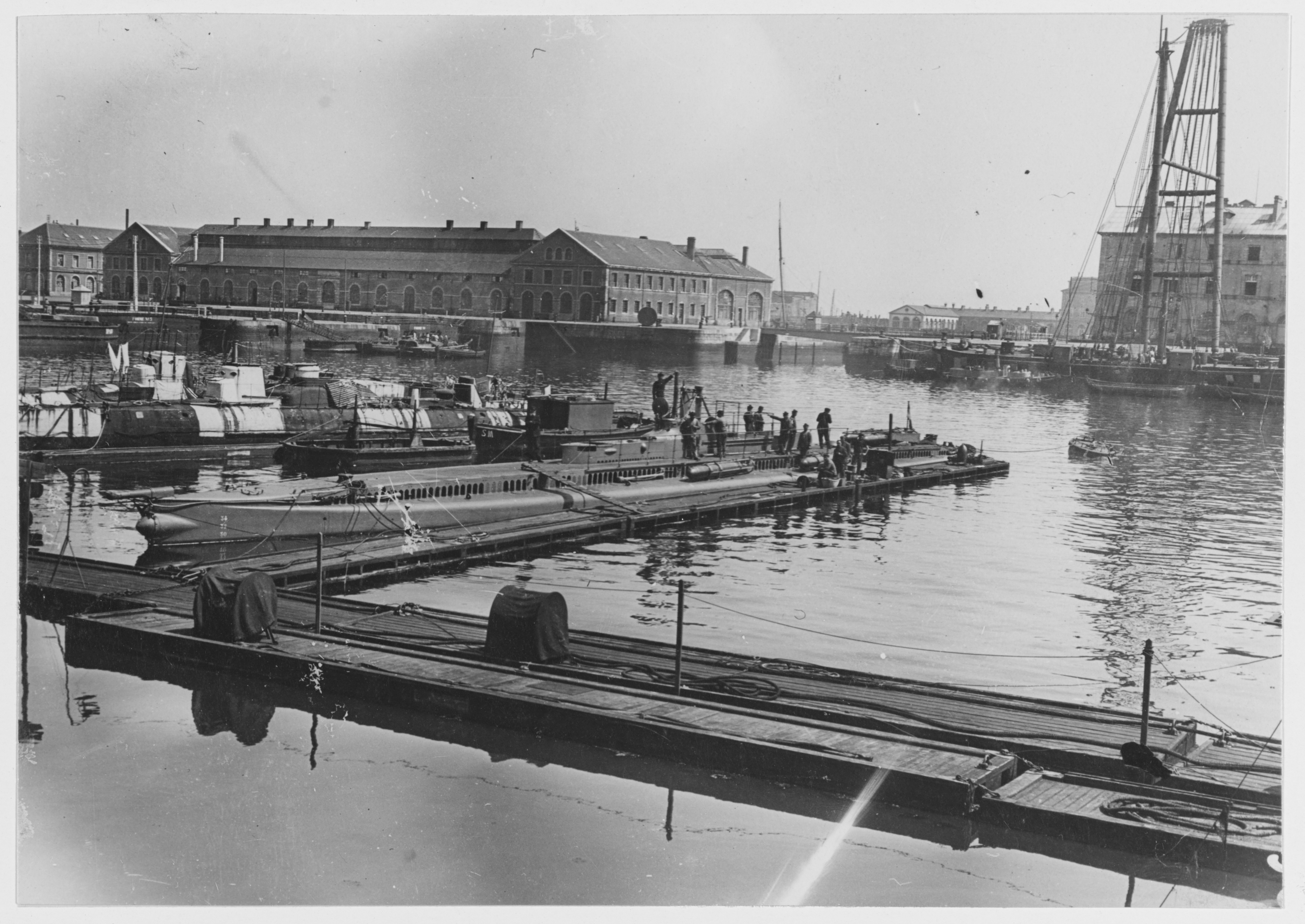
- An unidentified Brumaire-class submarine in Cherbourg

History

France
- Name: Volta
- Ordered: 29 October 1906
- Builder: Arsenal de Rochefort
- Laid down: 21 July 1909
- Launched: 23 September 1911
- Completed: 13 December 1912
- Stricken: 27 October 1922
- Identification: Budget number: Q79
- Fate: Sold for scrap, 22 March 1923

General characteristics (as built)
- Class & type: Brumaire-class submarine
- Displacement: 397 t (391 long tons) (surfaced); 551 t (542 long tons) (submerged)
- Length: 52.15 m (171 ft 1 in) (o/a)
- Beam: 5.42 m (17 ft 9 in)
- Draft: 3.19 m (10 ft 6 in)
- Installed power: 725 PS (533 kW; 715 bhp) (diesels); 660 PS (490 kW; 650 bhp) (electric motors)
- Propulsion: 2 × shafts; 2 × diesel engines; 2 × electric motors
- Speed: 13 knots (24 km/h; 15 mph) (surfaced); 8.8 knots (16.3 km/h; 10.1 mph) (submerged)
- Range: 2,000 nmi (3,700 km; 2,300 mi) at 9.6 knots (17.8 km/h; 11.0 mph) (surfaced); 84 nmi (156 km; 97 mi) at 5 knots (9.3 km/h; 5.8 mph) (submerged)
- Complement: 2 officers and 27 crewmen
- Armament: 1 × 450 mm (17.7 in) bow torpedo tube; 4 × single 450 mm Drzewiecki drop collars; 2 × single external 450 mm torpedo launchers

Volta was one of 16 Brumaire-class submarines built for the French Navy during the 1910s. Completed in 1912, the submarine was assigned to the 2nd Submarine Squadron based at Cherbourg when the First World War began in August 1914.

== Design and description ==
The Brumaire class was built as part of the French Navy's 1906 building program to a double-hull design by Maxime Laubeuf that were diesel-engined versions of the preceding Pluviôse class. The boats displaced 397 metric tons (391 long tons) surfaced and 551 metric tons (542 long tons) submerged. She had an overall length of 52.15 meters (171 ft 1 in), a beam of 5.42 meters (17 ft 9 in), and a draft of 3.19 meters (10 ft 6 in). Her crew numbered 29 officers and crewmen.

For surface running, the Brumaires were powered by two diesel engines, each driving one propeller shaft. The engines were designed to produce a total of 840 metric horsepower (829 bhp; 618 kW), but normally only produced 725 PS (715 bhp; 533 kW), which was enough to give the boats a speed of 13 knots (24 km/h; 15 mph). When submerged each shaft was driven by a 330-metric-horsepower (325 bhp; 243 kW) electric motor. The maximum speed underwater was 8.8 knots (16.3 km/h; 10.1 mph). They had a surface endurance of 2,000 nautical miles (3,700 km; 2,300 mi) at 9.6 knots (17.8 km/h; 11.0 mph) and a submerged endurance of 84 nmi (156 km; 97 mi) at 5 knots (9.3 km/h; 5.8 mph).

The Brumaire class was armed with one 450-millimeter (17.7 in) torpedo tube in the bow and 6 external 450 mm torpedo launchers; all of which were positioned on the top of the hull. The two forward ones were fixed outwards at an angle of six degrees. The other launchers were single rotating Drzewiecki drop collars amidships. They could traverse 135 degrees to each side of the boat. One reload was provided for the bow tube.

== Construction and career ==
Volta was ordered on 29 October 1906 and was laid down on 21 July 1909 at the Arsenal de Rochefort. The boat was launched on 23 September 1911 and commissioned on 13 December 1912. When the war began, she was assigned to the 2nd Submarine Squadron (2^{e} escadrille des sous-marins) of the 2nd Light Squadron (2^{e} escadre légère) at Cherbourg.

== Bibliography ==
- Couhat, Jean Labayle (1974). French Warships of World War I. London: Ian Allan. ISBN 0-7110-0445-5.
- Garier, Gérard (2002). A l'épreuve de la Grande Guerre. L'odyssée technique et humaine du sous-marin en France (in French). Vol. 3–2. Bourg-en-Bresse, France: Marines édition. ISBN 2-909675-81-5.
- Garier, Gérard (1998). Des Émeraude (1905-1906) au Charles Brun (1908–1933). L'odyssée technique et humaine du sous-marin en France (in French). Vol. 2. Bourg-en-Bresse, France: Marines édition. ISBN 2-909675-34-3.
- Roberts, Stephen S. (2021). French Warships in the Age of Steam 1859–1914: Design, Construction, Careers and Fates. Barnsley, UK: Seaforth Publishing. ISBN 978-1-5267-4533-0.
- Smigielski, Adam (1985). "France". In Gray, Randal (ed.). Conway's All the World's Fighting Ships 1906–1921. Annapolis, Maryland: Naval Institute Press. pp. 190–220. ISBN 0-87021-907-3.
