= Q62 =

Q62 may refer to:

- Q62 (New York City bus)
- Al-Jumu'ah, a surah of the Quran
- ARA Ciudad de Rosario (Q-62), an auxiliary ship of the Argentine Navy
- French submarine Frimaire
