= Q88 =

Q88 may refer to:

- Q88 (New York City bus)
- Al-Ghashiyah
- French submarine Le Verrier
