= Q63 =

Q63 may refer to:

- Q63 (New York City bus)
- Al-Munafiqun, a surah of the Quran
- ARA Punta Alta (Q-63), an auxiliary ship of the Argentine Navy
- French submarine Nivôse
