= Q60 =

Q60 may refer to:

- Q60 (motherboard)
- Q60 (New York City bus)
- Al-Mumtahanah, the 60th chapter of the Quran
- French submarine Brumaire (Q60)
- Infiniti Q60, an automobile
- Sierra Sky Park Airport, in Fresno County, California, United States
