= French submarine Foucault =

Brumaire-class submarine

History

France
- Name: Foucault
- Namesake: Léon Foucault
- Ordered: 30 October 1906
- Builder: Arsenal de Cherbourg
- Laid down: 1 November 1906
- Launched: 15 June 1912
- Commissioned: 20 June 1914
- Fate: Sunk in action 15 September 1916

General characteristics (as built)
- Class & type: Brumaire-class submarine
- Displacement: 397 t (391 long tons) (surfaced); 551 t (542 long tons) (submerged)
- Length: 52.15 m (171 ft 1 in) (o/a)
- Beam: 5.42 m (17 ft 9 in)
- Draft: 3.19 m (10 ft 6 in)
- Installed power: 840 PS (620 kW; 830 bhp) (diesels); 660 PS (490 kW; 650 bhp) (electric motors)
- Propulsion: 2 × shafts; 2 × diesel engines; 2 × electric motors
- Speed: 13 knots (24 km/h; 15 mph) (surfaced); 8.8 knots (16.3 km/h; 10.1 mph) (submerged)
- Range: 1,700 nmi (3,100 km; 2,000 mi) at 10 knots (19 km/h; 12 mph) (surfaced); 84 nmi (156 km; 97 mi) at 5 knots (9.3 km/h; 5.8 mph) (submerged)
- Test depth: 40 m (130 ft)
- Complement: 2 officers and 27 crewmen
- Armament: 1 × 450 mm (17.7 in) bow torpedo tube; 1 × twin 450 mm Drzewiecki drop collar; 2 × single 450 mm Drzewiecki drop collars; 2× single external 450 mm torpedo launchers

French submarine Foucault (Q70) was a Laubeuf type submarine of the Brumaire class, built for the French Navy prior to World War I.

== Design and construction ==
Foucault was ordered by the French Navy as part of its 1906 programme and was laid down at the Cherbourg Naval Yard in November of that year. Work progressed slowly, and she was not launched until 15 June 1912. She was commissioned on 20 June 1914. Foucault was equipped with licence-built M.A.N. diesel engines for surface propulsion, and electric motors for power while submerged. She carried eight torpedoes, two internally and six externally. Foucault was named for Léon Foucault, the 19th century French physicist.

== Service history ==
At the outbreak of the First World War Foucault was part of the French Mediterranean Fleet, and sailed with that force to the Adriatic tasked with bringing the Austro-Hungarian fleet to battle or blockading it in its home ports.

On 15 September 1916, while on patrol off Cattaro under the command of Lt. L. Devin, Foucault was spotted under the surface by two Austro-Hungarian Lohner L seaplanes. These were L132, flown by Lts. Dimitrije Konjović and Sewera, and L135 (Lts. Zelezny and Klimburg). The two planes bombed Foucault, scoring hits which forced her to surface. Unable to dive and without power, Devin ordered her to be abandoned and scuttled. All her crew escaped without casualties. The seaplanes landed and took the crew prisoner, holding them until the arrival of an Austrian torpedo boat. This incident was the first instance of a submarine at sea being sunk by air attack.

== Bibliography ==
- Couhat, Jean Labayle (1974). French Warships of World War I. London: Ian Allan. ISBN 0-7110-0445-5.
- Gardiner, Robert & Gray, Randal (1985). Conway's All The World's Fighting Ships 1906–1921. London: Conway Maritime Press. ISBN 0-85177-245-5.
- Garier, Gérard (2002). A l'épreuve de la Grande Guerre. L'odyssée technique et humaine du sous-marin en France (in French). Vol. 3–2. Bourg-en-Bresse, France: Marines édition. ISBN 2-909675-81-5.
- Garier, Gérard (1998). Des Émeraude (1905-1906) au Charles Brun (1908–1933). L'odyssée technique et humaine du sous-marin en France (in French). Vol. 2. Bourg-en-Bresse, France: Marines édition. ISBN 2-909675-34-3.
- Moore, J: Jane’s Fighting Ships of World War I (1919, reprinted 2003) ISBN 1 85170 378 0
- Price, A: Aircraft versus Submarine (1973) ISBN 1 84415 091 7
