= Brumaire-class submarine =

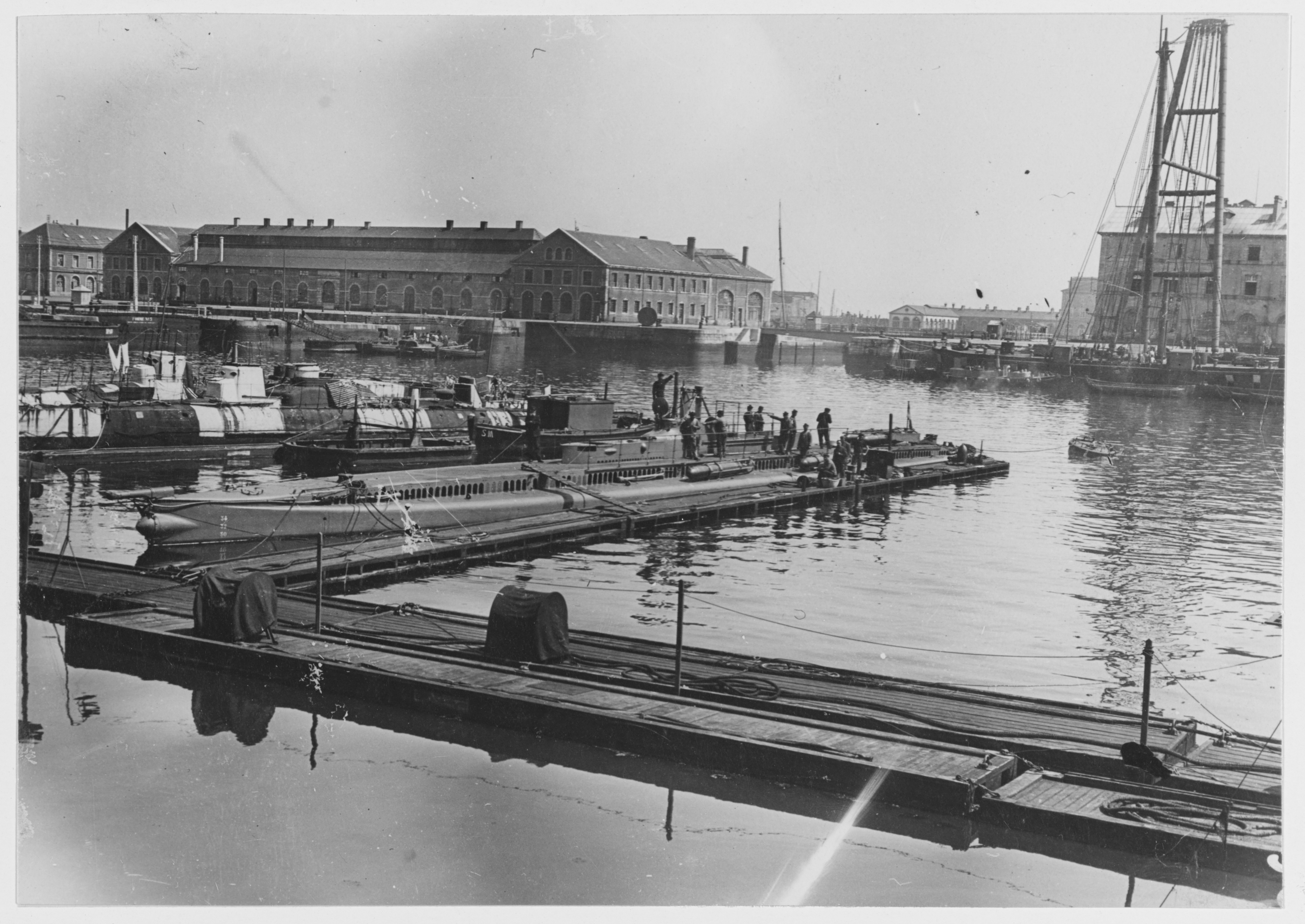
- An unidentified Brumaire-class submarine in Cherbourg

Class overview
- Name: Brumaire class
- Builders: Arsenal de Cherbourg; Arsenal de Toulon; Arsenal de Rochefort
- Operators: French Navy
- Preceded by: Pluviôse class
- Succeeded by: Archimède
- Subclasses: Joule
- Built: 1911–13
- In commission: 1911–28
- Completed: 16
- Lost: 3
- Scrapped: 13

General characteristics (as built)
- Type: Submarine
- Displacement: 397 t (391 long tons) (surfaced); 551 t (542 long tons) (submerged)
- Length: 52.15 m (171 ft 1 in) (o/a)
- Beam: 5.42 m (17 ft 9 in)
- Draft: 3.19 m (10 ft 6 in)
- Installed power: 840 PS (620 kW; 830 bhp) (diesels); 660 PS (490 kW; 650 bhp) (electric motors)
- Propulsion: 2 × shafts; 2 × diesel engines; 2 × electric motors
- Speed: 13 knots (24 km/h; 15 mph) (surfaced); 8.8 knots (16.3 km/h; 10.1 mph) (submerged)
- Range: 1,700 nmi (3,100 km; 2,000 mi) at 10 knots (19 km/h; 12 mph) (surfaced); 84 nmi (156 km; 97 mi) at 5 knots (9.3 km/h; 5.8 mph) (submerged)
- Test depth: 40 m (130 ft)
- Complement: 2 officers and 27 crewmen
- Armament: 1 × 450 mm (17.7 in) bow torpedo tube; 1 × twin 450 mm Drzewiecki drop collar; 2 × single 450 mm Drzewiecki drop collars; 2 × single external 450 mm torpedo launchers

The Brumaire-class submarines were built for the French Navy prior to World War I. There were sixteen vessels in this class, of the Laubeuf type.

All saw action during the First World War, with three boats lost.

== Naming ==
The French Navy built 34 Laubeuf-type submarines between 1906 and 1911. These are usually described as two classes, of which the Brumaire class was one, the other being the Pluviôse class. (Another source treats the vessels as one group, divided by the yards that built them). The boats had two naming schemes; the earlier vessels were named after the months of the French Revolutionary calendar, and the later ones after French scientists. However, apart from the name ship of the class, only two were named after months; the remaining thirteen boats of the Brumaire class were named for scientists.

== Design ==
The Brumaire class were Laubeuf type submarines, following the Laubeuf standard design of double hull and dual propulsion systems (as were the Pluviôse class). The Brumaire boats had electric motors for underwater propulsion, and are usually listed as having diesel engines for surface propulsion, though in practice this was mixed. While most had diesels several of the earlier boats had steam engines. These had been preferred by Laubeuf in the early stages, though later Laubeuf type submarines, such as the Circé-class submarine, predecessors to the Pluviôse and Brumaire classes, had used diesel engines, and some of the later Pluviôse boats had diesels.

== Construction ==
The Brumaire class were ordered in the 1906 programme and the first vessels were laid down the same year. However construction proceeded more slowly than the Pluviôse boats, and the first of the class, Brumaire was not launched until four years later, priority being given to the Pluviôse boats. The boats were built at three of the French Navy’s dockyards, at the Arsenals of Cherbourg, Rochefort and Toulon. The first of the class, Brumaire, was launched in April 1911, and the last, Franklin in March 1913.

== Armament ==
The Brumaire-class submarines were armed with 17.7-inch (450 mm) torpedoes, of which eight were carried. They had one 17.7 inch torpedo tube mounted in the bow, with one torpedo loaded and one carried as a reload, and six carried externally. Of these four were in Drzewiecki drop collars and two in external cradles alongside the conning tower.

== Service history ==
The Brumaire class were acknowledged to be good sea boats and saw action throughout the First World War on patrol and close blockade duty. Of the sixteen built, four were lost in action. Two vessels (Joule and Bernouilli) were mined; another (Foucault) was sunk by aircraft, the first incidence of such a loss. The fourth, Curie was lost attempting to penetrate the Austro-Hungarian naval base at Pola. She was later raised by the Austrians and put into service by them, but was returned after the Austrian surrender.

== Ships ==
Brumaire class submarines
| Name | No. | Launched | Fate |
|---|---|---|---|
| Brumaire | Q60 | 29 April 1911 | scrapped in 1930 |
| Frimaire | Q62 | 26 August 1911 | scrapped in 1923 |
| Nivôse | Q63 | 6 January 1912 | scrapped in 1921 |
| Foucault | Q70 | 15 June 1912 | Sunk by Austrian aircraft off Cattaro, 15 September 1915 |
| Euler | Q71 | 12 October 1912 | scrapped in the 1920s |
| Franklin | Q72 | 22 March 1913 | scrapped in 1922 |
| Faraday | Q78 | 27 June 1911 | scrapped in 1921 |
| Volta | Q79 | 23 September 1911 | scrapped in October 1922 |
| Newton | Q80 | 20 May 1912 | scrapped in December 1925 |
| Montgolfier | Q81 | 18 April 1912 | scrapped in 1921 |
| Bernouilli (sic) | Q83 | 1 June 1911 | 4 April 1916, entered Cattaro, blew stern off Austrian destroyer Csepel; mined 13 February 1918 (Note: Bernouilli named after Bernoulli family, but according to the sources here does not use the same spelling) |
| Joule | Q84 | 7 September 1911 | Mined, Dardanelles, 1 May 1915 |
| Coulomb | Q85 | 13 June 1912 | scrapped in 1919 |
| Arago | Q86 | 29 June 1912 | disarmed in 1921, scrapped in 1931 |
| Curie | Q87 | 18 July 1912 | Sunk 20 December 1914, attacking Austro-Hungarian Navy base Pola. Salvaged, SM U-14, returned to France post-war, scrapped in 1923 |
| Le Verrier | Q88 | 31 October 1912 | scrapped in 1925 |

== See also ==
- List of submarines of France

== Bibliography ==
- Couhat, Jean Labayle (1974). French Warships of World War I. London: Ian Allan. ISBN 0-7110-0445-5.
- Garier, Gérard (2002). A l'épreuve de la Grande Guerre. L'odyssée technique et humaine du sous-marin en France (in French). Vol. 3–2. Bourg-en-Bresse, France: Marines édition. ISBN 2-909675-81-5.
- Garier, Gérard (1998). Des Émeraude (1905-1906) au Charles Brun (1908–1933). L'odyssée technique et humaine du sous-marin en France (in French). Vol. 2. Bourg-en-Bresse, France: Marines édition. ISBN 2-909675-34-3.
- Moore, John (2003) [First published 1919]. Jane's Fighting Ships of World War I. London, England: Jane's Publishing Company. ISBN 1-85170-378-0.
- Roberts, Stephen S. (2021). French Warships in the Age of Steam 1859–1914: Design, Construction, Careers and Fates. Barnsley, UK: Seaforth Publishing. ISBN 978-1-5267-4533-0.
- Roche, Jean-Michel (2005). "Classement par types". Dictionnaire des bâtiments de la flotte de guerre française de Colbert à nos jours 2, 1870 - 2006. Toulon: Roche. ISBN 978-2-9525917-0-6. OCLC 165892922.
- Smigielski, Adam (1985). "France". In Gray, Randal (ed.). Conway's All the World's Fighting Ships 1906–1921. Annapolis, Maryland: Naval Institute Press. pp. 190–220. ISBN 0-87021-907-3.
