= French submarine Bernoulli =

Brumaire-class submarine

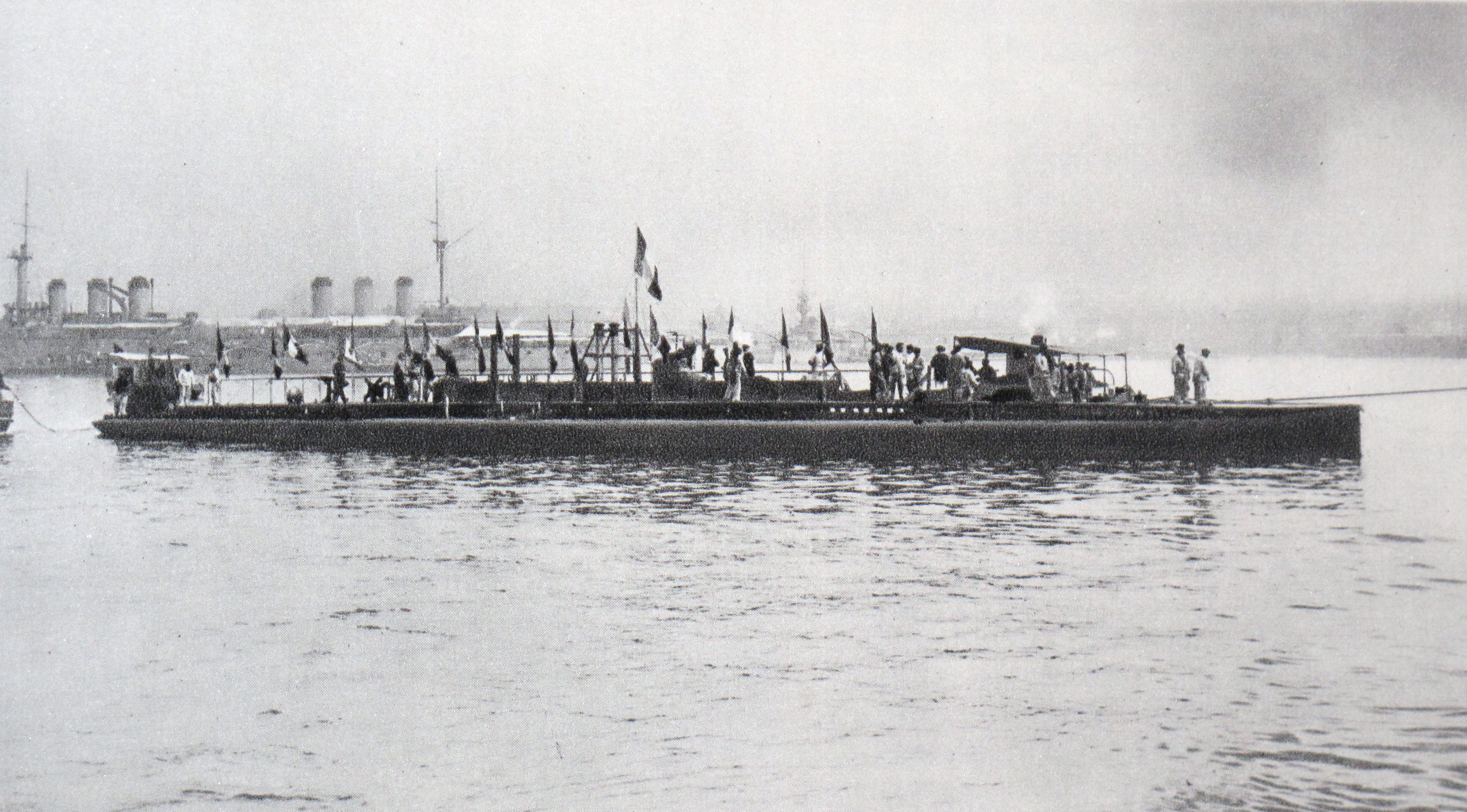

History

France
- Name: Bernoulli
- Namesake: Daniel Bernoulli (Note: Though the French Navy named this submarine for members of the Bernoulli family, it seems they did not use the same spelling; according to the sources here the boat's name is Bernouilli.)
- Ordered: 29 October 1906
- Builder: Arsenal de Toulon
- Laid down: 1 November 1906
- Launched: 1 June 1911
- Commissioned: 29 October 1912
- Fate: Sunk in action 13 February 1918

General characteristics (as built)
- Class & type: Brumaire-class submarine
- Displacement: 397 t (391 long tons) (surfaced); 551 t (542 long tons) (submerged)
- Length: 52.15 m (171 ft 1 in) (o/a)
- Beam: 5.42 m (17 ft 9 in)
- Draft: 3.19 m (10 ft 6 in)
- Installed power: 840 PS (620 kW; 830 bhp) (diesels); 660 PS (490 kW; 650 bhp) (electric motors)
- Propulsion: 2 × shafts; 2 × diesel engines; 2 × electric motors
- Speed: 13 knots (24 km/h; 15 mph) (surfaced); 8.8 knots (16.3 km/h; 10.1 mph) (submerged)
- Range: 1,700 nmi (3,100 km; 2,000 mi) at 10 knots (19 km/h; 12 mph) (surfaced); 84 nmi (156 km; 97 mi) at 5 knots (9.3 km/h; 5.8 mph) (submerged)
- Test depth: 40 m (130 ft)
- Complement: 2 officers and 27 crewmen
- Armament: 1 × 450 mm (17.7 in) bow torpedo tube; 1 × twin 450 mm Drzewiecki drop collar; 2 × single 450 mm Drzewiecki drop collars; 2× single external 450 mm torpedo launchers

French submarine Bernoulli (Q83) was a Laubeuf type submarine of the Brumaire class, built for the French Navy prior to World War I.

== Design and construction ==
Bernoulli was ordered by the French Navy as part of its 1906 programme and was laid down at the Arsenal de Toulon in November of that year. Work progressed slowly, and she was not launched until 1 June 1911. She was commissioned on 29 October 1912. She was equipped with licence-built M.A.N. diesel engines for surface propulsion, and electric motors for power while submerged. She carried eight torpedoes, two internally and six externally. Bernoulli was named for Daniel Bernoulli, the 18th century Swiss mathematician, and other members of the Bernoulli family.

== Service history ==
On 30 November 1914, under the command of Lt. Defforges, Bernoulli attempted to penetrate the harbour at Cattaro. She was detected and forced to retire. On 28 April 1915 Bernoulli made another attempt on Cattaro. On this occasion she gained entrance, but found no targets and again had to retire. On 4 May 1916, now under the command of Lt. Rene Audry, Bernoulli sighted the Austrian destroyer SMS Csepel. She closed and attacked, scoring a torpedo hit on Csepel’s stern. Czepel was badly damaged, and thought to have sunk, but in fact gained port. On 15 May 1917, during the aftermath of the battle at the Otranto Barrage, Bernoulli encountered a group of Austrian destroyers running for home, and fired on Balaton. However this attack was unsuccessful and Balaton escaped. On 27 October 1917 Bernoulli sighted the German U-boat UC 38. She closed and attacked but was unable to score a hit; UC 38 escaped without damage. Bernoulli’s final patrol was in February 1918, on close blockade duty off Cattaro. She was not heard from after 13 February 1918 and is believed to have struck a mine off Cattaro and sunk. All 23 of her crew were lost. Her commander, Rene Audry, was honoured by having a submarine named after him.

== Bibliography ==
- Couhat, Jean Labayle (1974). French Warships of World War I. London: Ian Allan. ISBN 0-7110-0445-5.
- Gardiner, Robert & Gray, Randal (1985). Conway's All The World's Fighting Ships 1906–1921. London: Conway Maritime Press. ISBN 0-85177-245-5.
- Garier, Gérard (2002). A l'épreuve de la Grande Guerre. L'odyssée technique et humaine du sous-marin en France (in French). Vol. 3–2. Bourg-en-Bresse, France: Marines édition. ISBN 2-909675-81-5.
- Garier, Gérard (1998). Des Émeraude (1905-1906) au Charles Brun (1908–1933). L'odyssée technique et humaine du sous-marin en France (in French). Vol. 2. Bourg-en-Bresse, France: Marines édition. ISBN 2-909675-34-3.
- Halpern, P: A Naval History of World War I (1994) ISBN 1 85728 295 7
- Moore, J: Jane’s Fighting Ships of World War I (1919, reprinted 2003) ISBN 1 85170 378 0
- Roche, Jean-Michel (2005). "Classement par types". Dictionnaire des bâtiments de la flotte de guerre française de Colbert à nos jours 2, 1870 - 2006. Toulon: Roche. ISBN 978-2-9525917-0-6. OCLC 165892922.
