= Drzewiecki drop collar =

External torpedo launching system

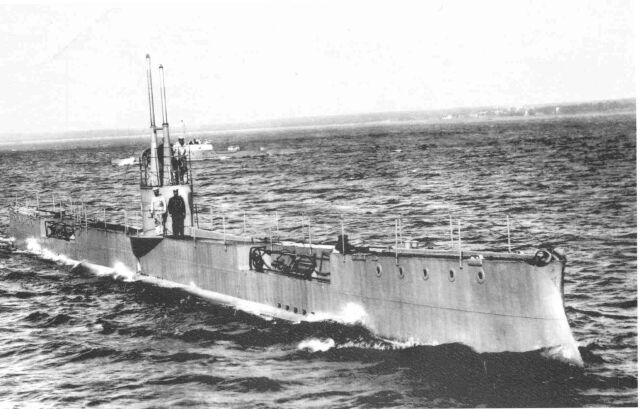
Empty drop collars on the Russian submarine Akula, 1909

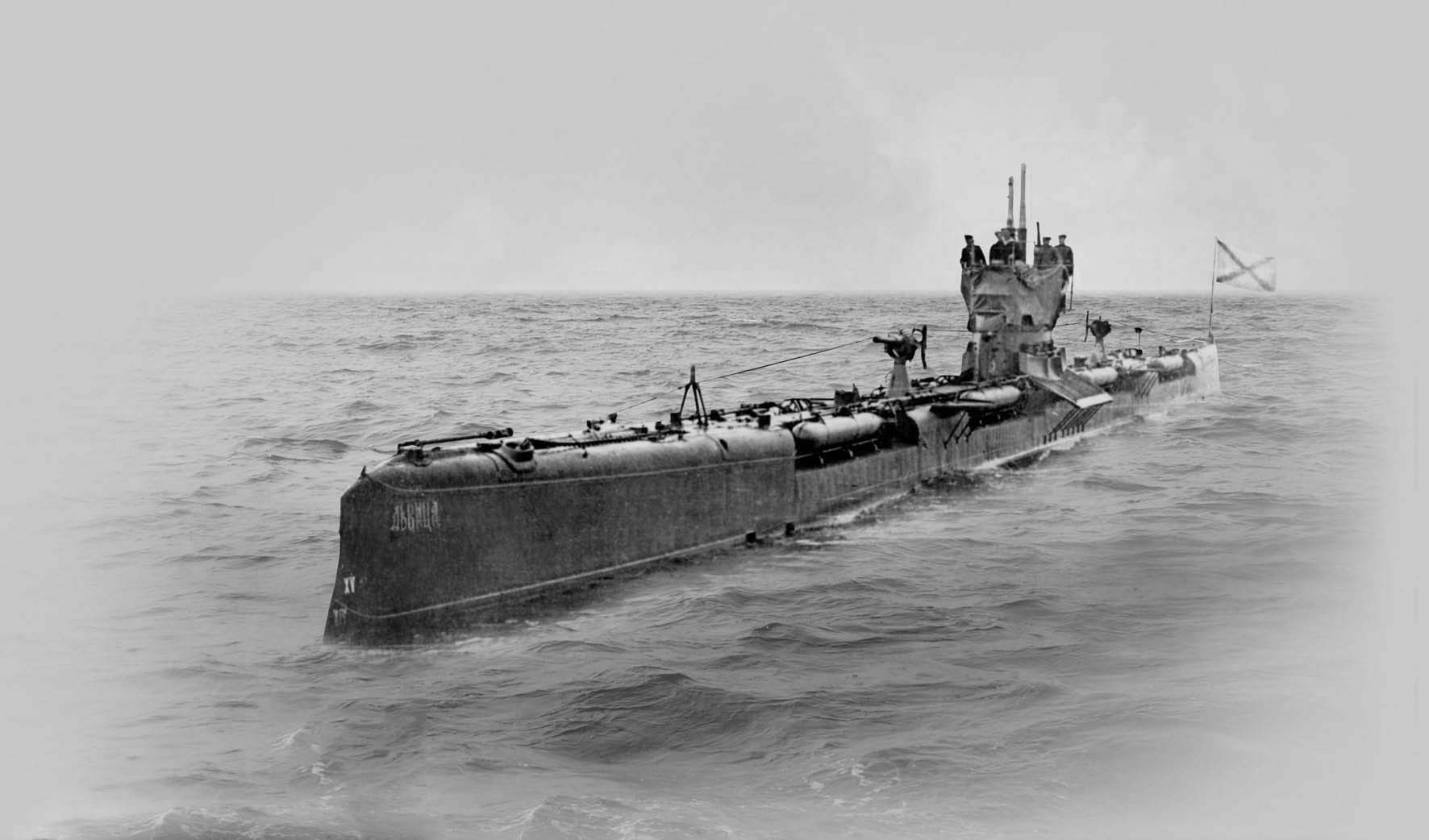
The Bars-class submarine Lvitsa showing four of her eight drop collars loaded with torpedoes, about 1916–1917

The Drzewiecki drop collar was an external torpedo launching system most commonly used by the French and Imperial Russian Navies in the first two decades of the 20th century. It was designed by Stefan Drzewiecki, a Polish engineer and inventor. He designed and built the first submarine in the world with electric battery-powered propulsion (1881).

Generally, the drop collar consisted of a metal framework that enclosed the torpedo that could be rotated to position it clear of the hull preparatory to firing. More elaborate systems were equipped with an arm that could move the drop collar to the desired firing angle. The French deployed a twin system on the aft deck of the Pluviôse class that could be rotated from 20° to 170° from the centerline on each side of the ship.

== Sources ==
- Polmar, Norman & Noot, Jurrien (1991). Submarines of the Russian and Soviet Navies, 1718–1990. Annapolis, Maryland: Naval Institute Press. ISBN 0-87021-570-1.
- Smigielski, Adam (2015). "Question 27/50: Drzwiecki Submarine Torpedo Drop Collars". Warship International. LII (3): 222–223. ISSN 0043-0374.
