= List of submarines of France =

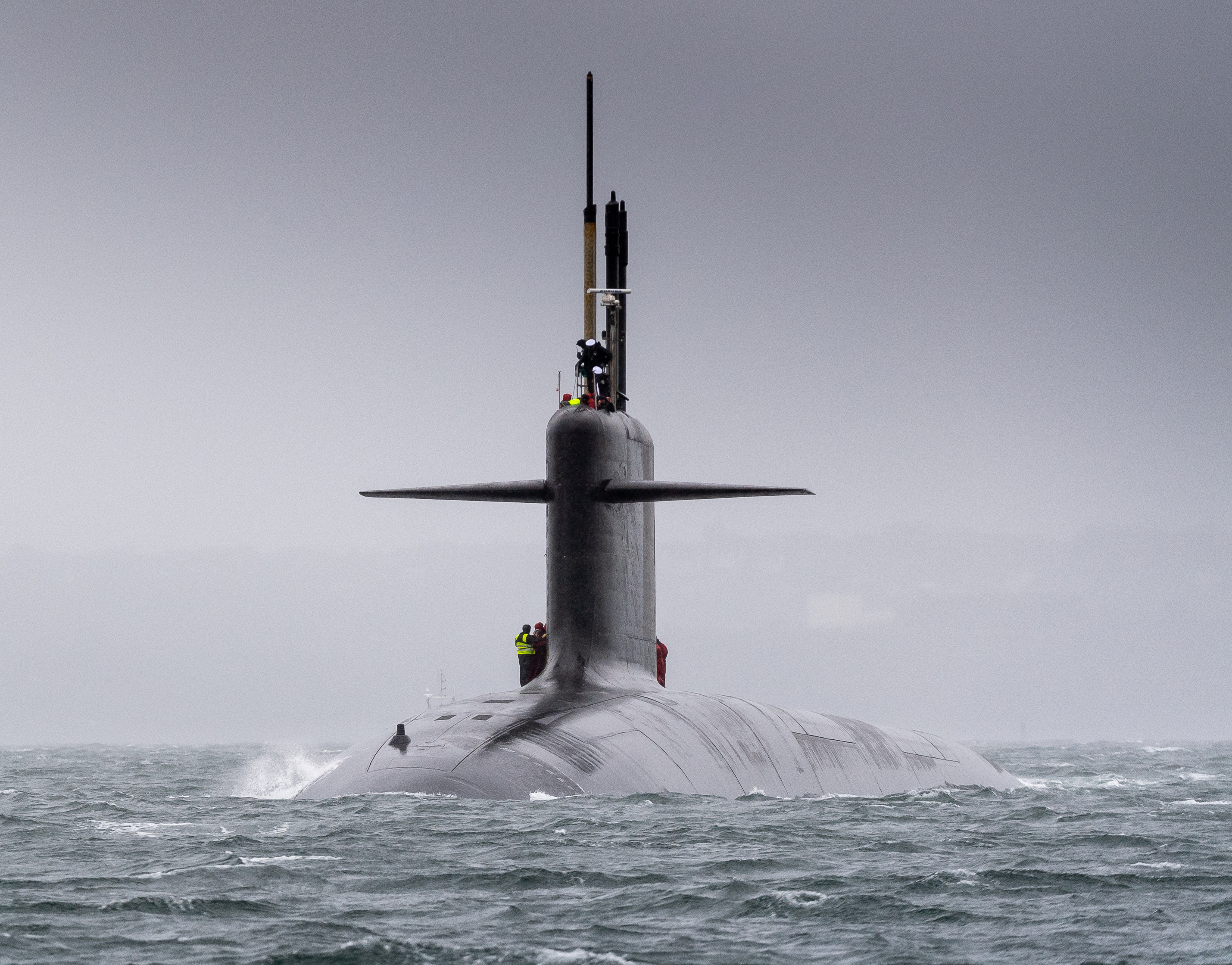
Le Triomphant (S616)

The submarines of France include nuclear attack submarines and nuclear ballistic missile submarines of various classes, operated by the French Navy as part of the French Submarine Forces. France also builds Scorpène-class submarines for international buyers; the Brazilian submarine Álvaro Alberto, a nuclear-powered boat, will be developed from this platform.

Each French Navy vessel, including submarines, has their respective fanion insignia for military awards and decorations.

== In service ==
=== Nuclear attack submarines ===
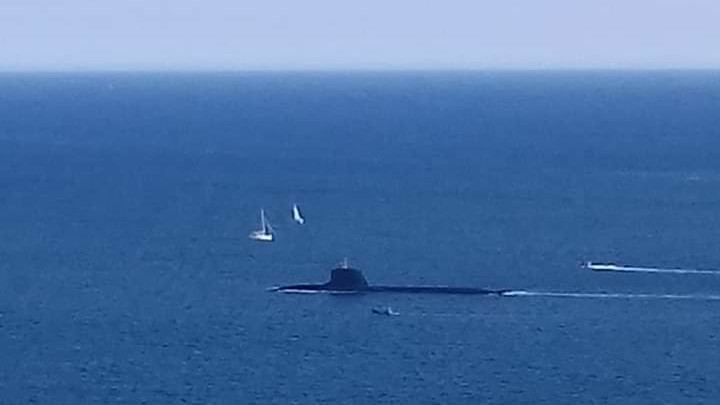
Suffren (Q284)

- Rubis class
  1. Améthyste (S605) (1992–present)
- Suffren class
  1. Suffren (Q284/S635) (2020–present)
  2. Duguay-Trouin (S636) (2023–present)
  3. Tourville (S637) (2024–present)
  4. De Grasse (S638) (2026-present)

=== Nuclear ballistic missile submarines ===
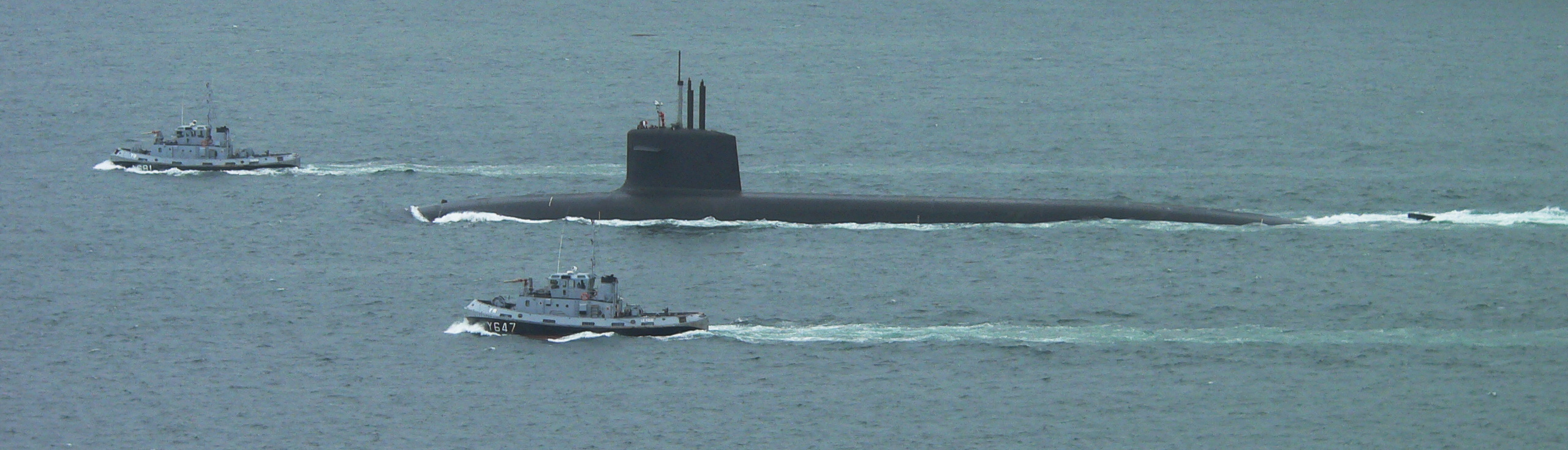
Le Terrible (S619)

- Triomphant class
  1. Le Triomphant (S616) (1997–present)
  2. Le Téméraire (S617) (1999–present)
  3. Le Vigilant (S618) (2004–present)
  4. Le Terrible (S619) (2010–present)

== Planned ==
=== Nuclear attack submarines ===
- Suffren class
  1. Rubis (Laid down 2019)
  2. Casabianca (Laid down 2020)

=== Nuclear ballistic missile submarines ===
- SNLE 3G-class
  1. L'Invincible (first steel cut 2024)

== Retired from service ==
Each French submarine from Gymnote onwards when ordered/constructed was given a sequential hull number (prefixed by the letter 'Q'). The sequence included submarines built in France for foreign navies, accounting for several gaps in the 'Q' numbering below.

=== 1863 to 1903 ===
- Plongeur (1863–1872)
- Gymnote (Q1) (1888–1908)
- Gustave Zédé (Q2) (1893–1909)
- Morse (Q3) (1899–1909)
- Narval (Q4) (1900–1909)
- Sirène class (1901–1919)
  - Sirène (Q5)
  - Triton (Q6)
  - Espadon (Q13)
  - Silure (Q14)
- Farfadet class (1901–1913)
  - Farfadet (Q7) renamed Follet (1908–1913)
  - Korrigan (Q8)
  - Gnome (Q9)
  - Lutin (Q10)
- Français class (1901–1914)
  - Français (Q11)
  - Algérien (Q12)
- Naïade class (1903–1914)
  - Naïade (Q15)
  - Protée (Q16)
  - Perle (Q17)
  - Esturgeon (Q18)
  - Bonite (Q19)
  - Thon (Q20)
  - Souffleur (Q21)
  - Dorade (Q22)
  - Lynx (Q23)
  - Ludion (Q24)
  - Loutre (Q25)
  - Castor (Q26)
  - Phoque (Q27)
  - Otarie (Q28)
  - Méduse (Q29)
  - Oursin (Q30)
  - Grondin (Q31)
  - Anguille (Q32)
  - Alose (Q33)
  - Truite (Q34)

=== 1904 to 1919 ===
- Experimental types (varying designs)
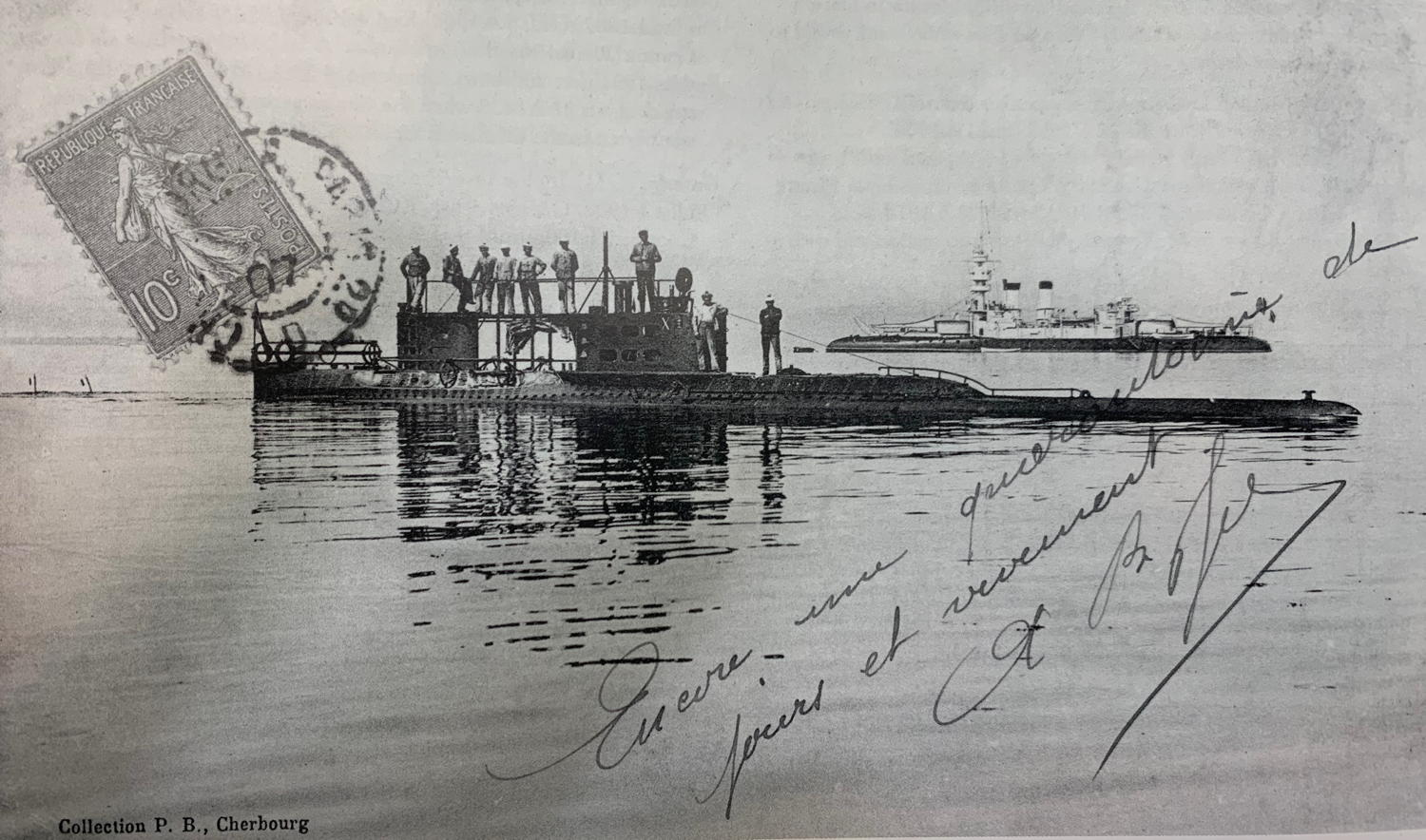
  X
  - X (Q35) – renamed Dauphin 13 February 1911 (1904–1914)
  - Z (Q36)
  - Y (Q37) – (1905–1909)
- Aigrette class (1904–1919)
  - Aigrette (Q38)
  - Cigogne (Q39)
- Argonaute (Q40)
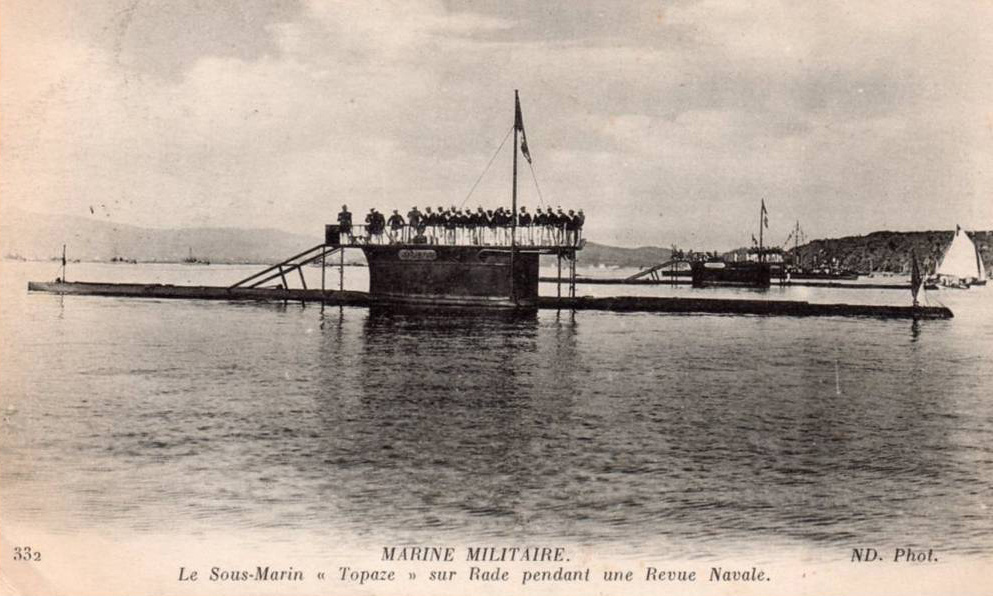
- Topaze
  Émeraude class (1906–1919)
  - Émeraude (Q41)
  - Opale (Q42)
  - Rubis (Q43)
  - Saphir (Q44)
  - Topaze (Q45)
  - Turquoise (Q46)
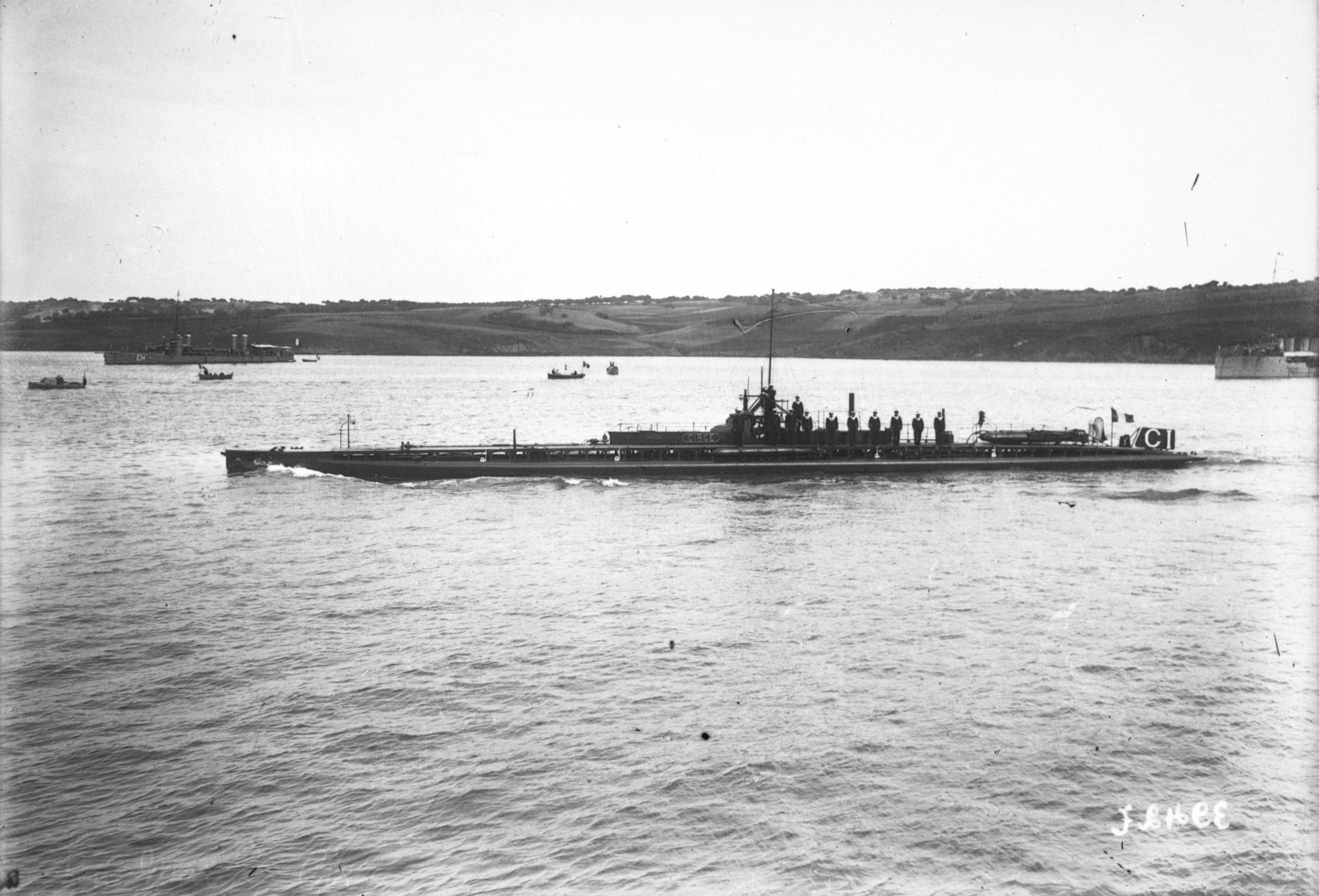
- Circé
  Circé class (1907–1918)
  - Circé (Q47)
  - Calypso (Q48)
- Guêpe class
  - Guèpe 1 (Q49)
  - Guèpe 2 (Q50)
- Pluviôse class
  - Pluviôse (Q51)
  - Ventôse (Q52)
  - Germinal (Q53)
  - Floréal (Q54)
  - Priarial (Q55)
  - Messidor (Q56)
  - Thermidor (Q57)
  - Fructidor (Q58)
  - Vendémiaire (Q59)
  - Papin (Q64)
  - Fresnel (Q65)
  - Berthelot (Q66)
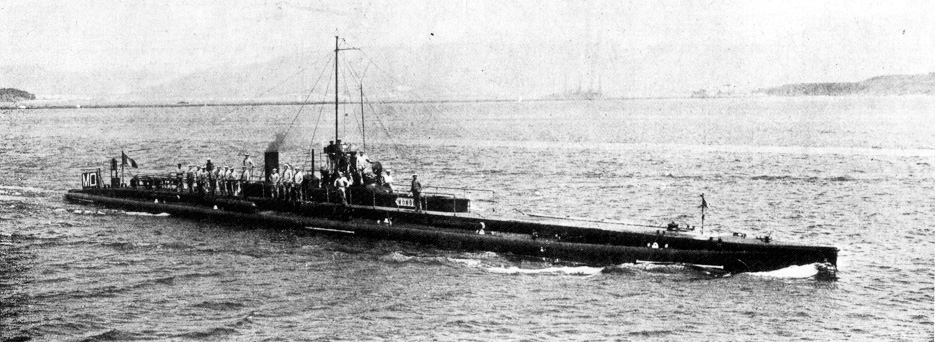
  - Monge
    Monge (Q67)
  - Ampère (Q68)
  - Gay-Lussac (Q69)
  - Watt (Q75)
  - Cugnot (Q76)
  - Giffard (Q77)
- Archimède (Q73) (1909–1919)
- Charles Brun (Q89) (1911–1915)
- Mariotte (Q74) (1911–1915)
- Brumaire class (1911–1930)
  - Brumaire (Q60)
  - Frimaire (Q62)
  - Nivôse (Q63)
  - Foucault (Q70)
  - Euler (Q71)
  - Franklin (Q72)
  - Faraday (Q78)
  - Volta (Q79)
  - Newton (Q80)
  - Montgolfier (Q81)
  - Bernoulli (Q83)
  - Joule (Q84)
  - Coulomb (Q85)
  - Arago (Q86)
  - Curie (Q87)
  - Le Verrier (Q88)
- Amiral Bourgois (Q82) (1912–1919)
- Clorinde class (1913–1926)
  - Clorinde (Q90)
  - Cornélie (Q91)
- Gustave Zédé class (1913–1937)
  - Gustave Zédé (Q92)
  - Néréide (Q93)
- Amphitrite class (1914–1935)
  - Amphitrite (Q94)
  - Astrée (Q95)
  - Artémis (Q96)
  - Aréthuse (Q97)
  - Atalante (Q98)
  - Amarante (Q99)
  - Ariane (Q100)
  - Andromaque (Q101)
- Bellone class (1914–1935)
  - Bellone (Q102)
  - Hermione (Q103)
  - Gorgone (Q104)

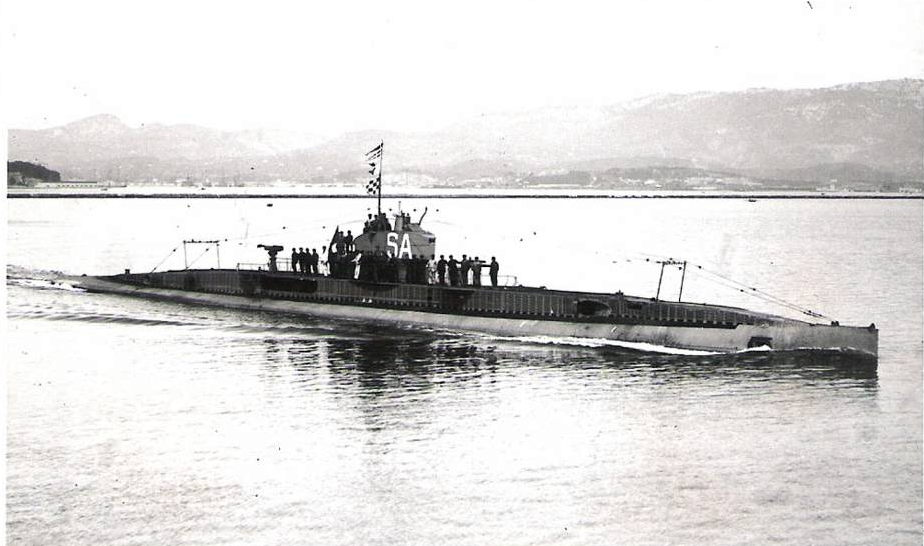
Sané

- Dupuy de Lôme class (1915–1935)
  - Dupuy de Lôme (Q105)
  - Sané (Q106)
- Diane class (1915–1935)
  - Diane (Q107)
  - Daphné (Q108)
- Armide class (1915–1935)
  - Armide (SD 2) ex-Japanese
  - Antigone (SD 3) ex-Greek
  - Amazone (SD 4) ex-Greek
- Joessel class (1917–1935)
  - Joessel (Q109)
  - Fulton (Q110)
  - Six more of this class (Q115-Q120) were in the 1915 Programme but were cancelled (never named)

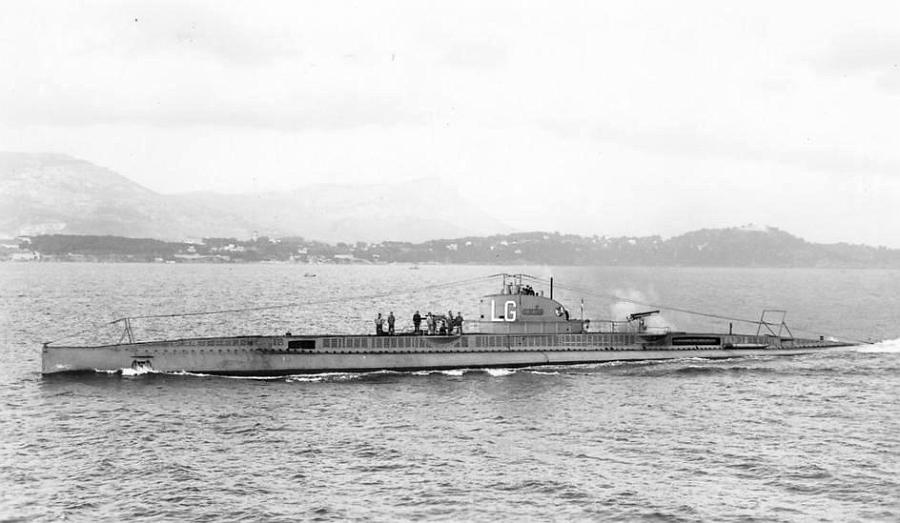
Laplace

- Lagrange class (1917–1937)
  - Laplace (Q111)
  - Lagrange (Q112)
  - Regnault (Q113)
  - Romazotti (Q114)
- UA class (Germany) (1918–1937)
  - Jean-Autric (ex U-105)
  - Léon Mignot (ex U-108)
  - Pierre Marast (ex U-162)
  - Jean Roulier (ex U-166)
- UE class (Germany) (1918–1935)
  - Victor Reveille (ex U-79)
  - René Audry (ex U-119)
- German Type U 139 submarine (Germany) (1918–1935)
  - Helbronn (ex U-139)
- German Type UB II submarine (Germany) (1916–1937)
  - Roland Morillot (ex UB-23)
  - Trinité-Schillemans (ex UB-94)
  - Carissan (ex UB-99)
  - Jean Corre (ex UB-155)

=== 1919 to 1944 ===
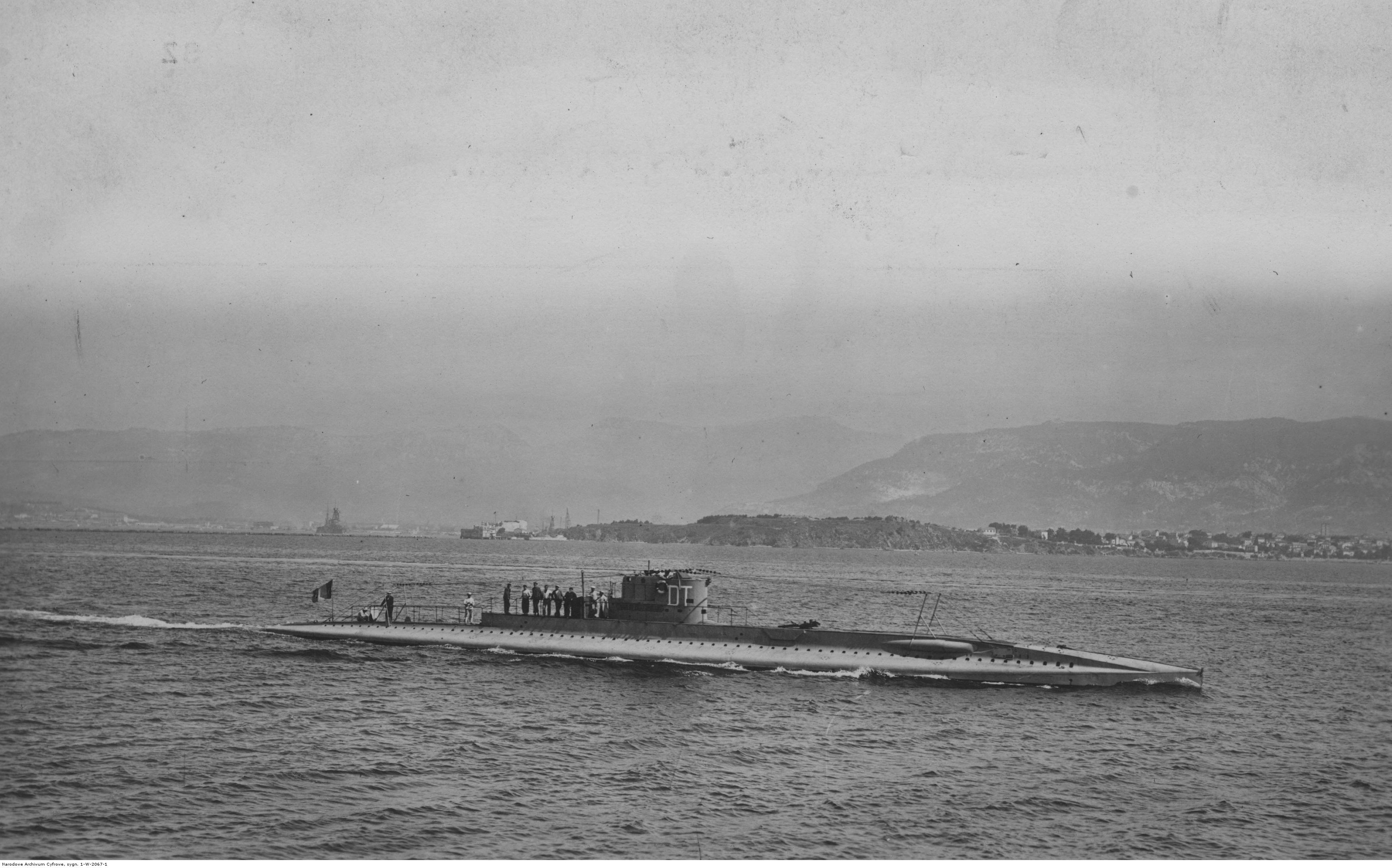
Louis Dupetit-Thouars

Pierre Chailley

- O'Byrne class (1919–1935)
  - O'Byrne
  - Henri Fournier
  - Louis Dupetit-Thouars
- Maurice Callot Minelaying submarine (1922–1936)
- Pierre Chailley Minelaying submarine (1923–1936)
- 600 Series (1925–1946)
  - Ariane class (1925–1942)
    - Ondine (Q121)
    - Ariane (Q122)
    - Eurydice (Q130)
    - Danaé (Q131)
  - Sirène class (1925–1942)
    - Sirène (Q123)
    - Naïade (Q124)
    - Galatée (Q132)
    - Nymphe (Q133)
  - Circé class (1927–1942)
    - Circé (Q125)
    - Calypso (Q126)
    - Thétis (Q134)
    - Doris (Q135)
  - Argonaute class (1932–1946)
    - Aréthuse (NN7)
    - Argonaute (NN6)
    - Atalante (Q162)
    - La Vestale (Q176)
    - La Sultane (Q177)
  - Orion class (1932–1943)
    - Orion (Q165)
    - Ondine (Q166)
  - Diane class (1932–1946)
    - Diane (NN4)
    - Méduse (NN5)
    - Amphitrite (Q159)
    - Antiope (Q160)
    - Amazone (Q161)
    - Orphée (Q163)
    - Oréade (Q164)
    - La Psyché (Q174)
    - Sibylle (Q175)
- Requin class (1926–1946)
  - Requin (Q115)
  - Souffleur (Q116)
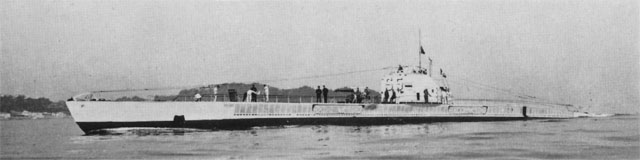
  - Morse
    Morse (Q117)
  - Narval (Q118)
  - Marsouin (Q119)
  - Dauphin (Q120)
  - Caïman (Q127)
  - Phoque (Q128)
  - Espadon (Q129)
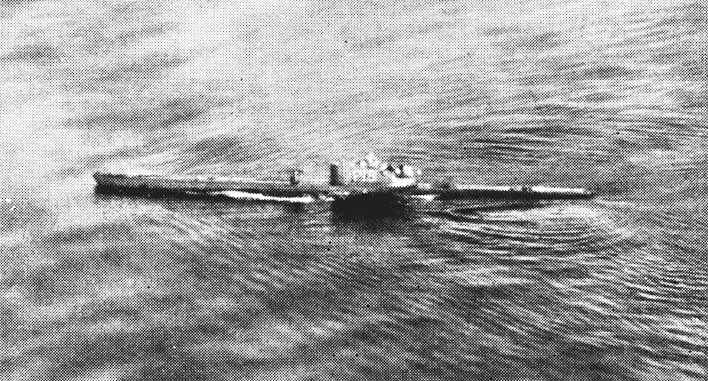
- Rubis
  Saphir class Minelaying submarines (1930–1949)
  - Saphir (Q145)
  - Turquoise (Q146)
  - Nautilus (Q152)
  - Rubis (Q158)
  - Diamant (Q173)
  - Perle (Q184)
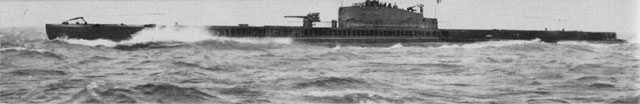
- Redoutable
  Redoutable class (1931–1952)
  - Type M-5
    - Redoutable (Q136)
    - Vengeur (Q137)
  - Type M-6
    - Pascal (Q138)
    - Pasteur (Q139)
    - Henri Poincaré (Q140)
    - Poncelet (Q141)
    - Archimède (Q142)
    - Fresnel (Q143)
    - Monge (Q144)
    - Achille (Q147)
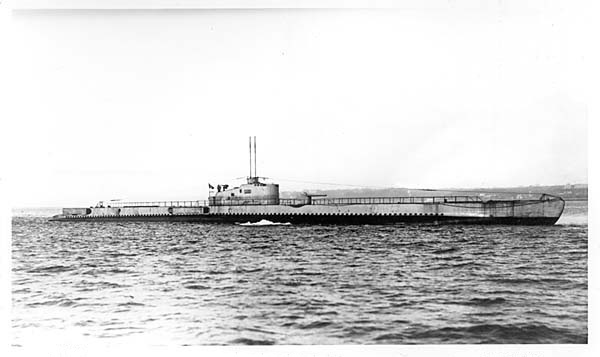
    - Ajax
      Ajax (Q148)
    - Actéon (Q149)
    - Achéron (Q150)
    - Argo (Q151)
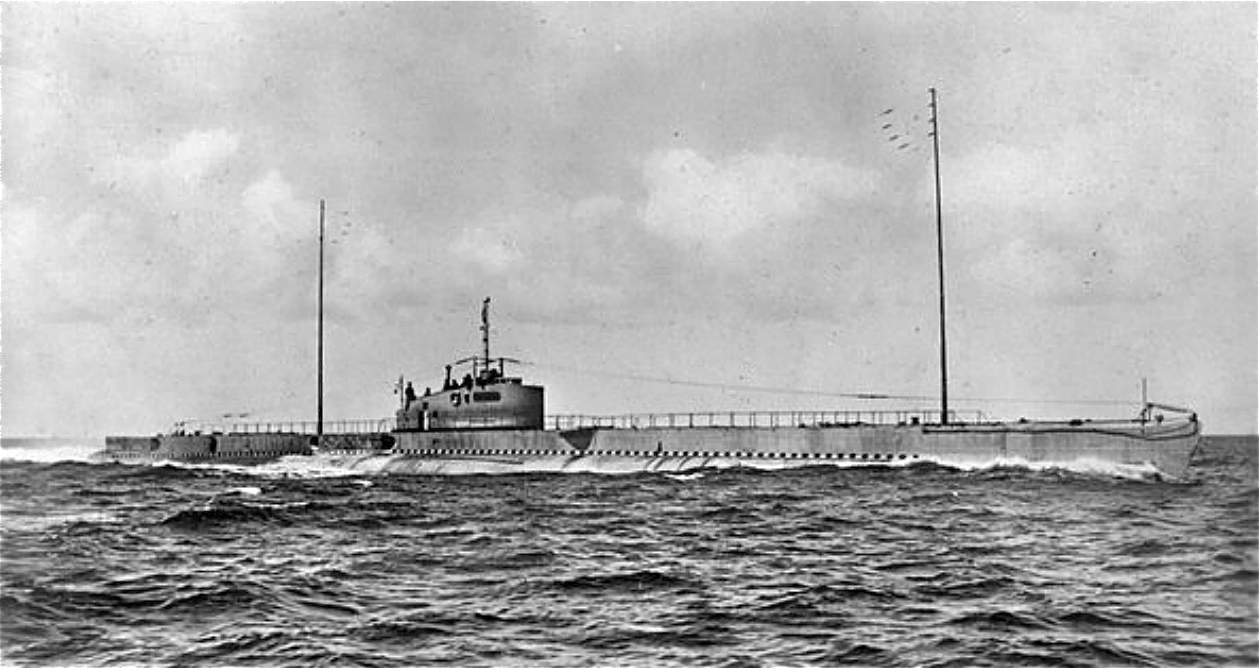
    - Prométhée
      Prométhée (Q153)
    - Persée (Q154)
    - Protée (Q155)
    - Pégase (Q156)
    - Phénix (Q157)
    - L'Espoir (Q167)
    - Le Glorieux (Q168)
    - Le Centaure (Q169)
    - Le Héros (Q170)
    - Le Conquérant (Q171)
    - Le Tonnant (Q172)
    - Agosta (Q178)
    - Bévéziers (Q179)
    - Ouessant (Q180)
    - Sidi Ferruch (Q181)
    - Sfax (Q182)
    - Casabianca (Q183)
- Surcouf (1934–1942)

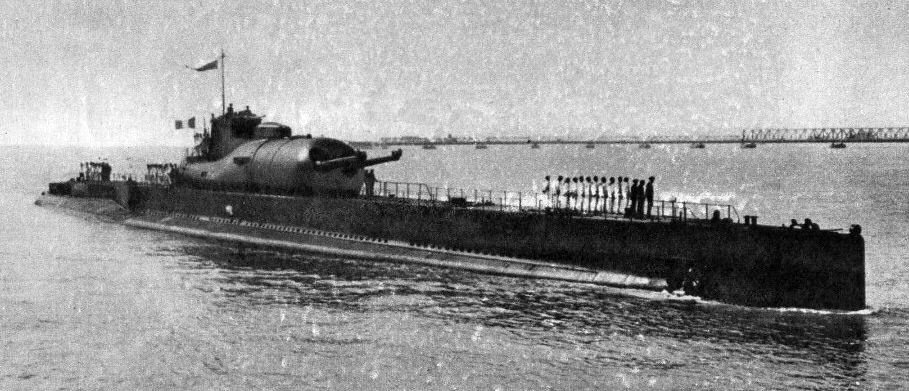
Surcouf in 1935

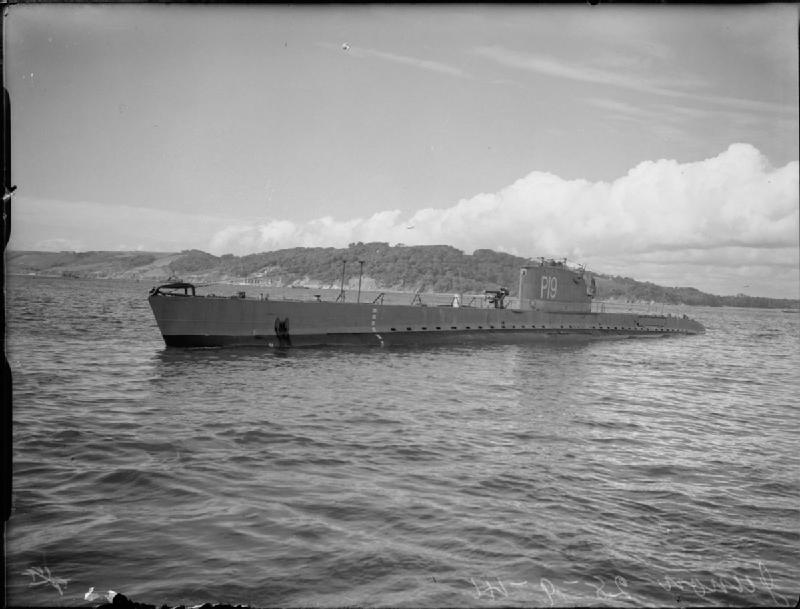
- Junon
  Minerve class (1936–1954)
  - Minerve (Q185)
  - Junon (Q186)
  - Vénus (Q187)
  - Iris (Q188)
  - Pallas (Q189)
  - Céres (Q190)
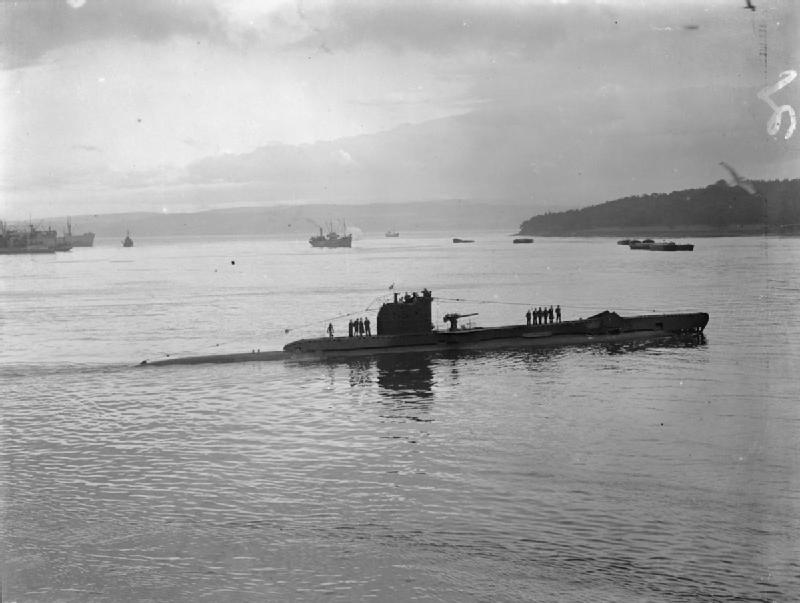
- Curie
  British U class (1943–1946)
  - Curie
  - Doris
  - Morse
- Aurore class (1940–1960)
  - Aurore (Q192)
  - Créole (Q193)
  - Bayadère (Q194) – never completed
  - Favorite (Q195)
  - Africaine (Q196)
  - Astrée (Q200)
  - Andromède (Q201)
  - Antigone (Q202) – construction abandoned 1940
  - Andromaque (Q203) – construction abandoned 1940
  - Artémis (Q206)
  - Armide (Q207) – construction abandoned 1940
  - Hermione (Q211) – construction abandoned 1940
  - Gorgone (Q212) – construction abandoned 1940
  - Clorinde (Q213) – construction abandoned 1940
  - Cornélie (Q214) – construction abandoned 1940
- Roland Morillot class (cancelled 1940)
  - Roland Morillot (Q191)
  - La Praya (Q198)
  - La Martinique (Q199)
  - La Guadeloupe (Q204)
  - La Réunion (Q205)
  - unnamed (Q228)
  - unnamed (Q229)
  - unnamed (Q230)
- Émeraude class Minelaying submarines (authorised only, cancelled 1940)
  - Émeraude (Q197)
  - Agate (Q208)
  - Corail (Q209)
  - Escarboucle (Q210)
- Phénix class (cancelled 1940)
  - Vendémiaire (Q215)
  - Brumaire (Q216)
  - Frimaire (Q217)
  - Nivôse (Q218)
  - Pluviôse (Q219)
  - Ventôse (Q220)
  - Germinal (Q221)
  - Floréal (Q222)
  - Prairial (Q223)
  - Messidor (Q224)
  - Thermidor (Q225)
  - Fructidor (Q226)
  - Phénix (Q227)

=== 1944 to 1971 ===
- German Type VII submarine (Germany) (1944–1963)
  - Millé (ex U-471)
  - Laubie (ex U-766) (Germany) (1945–1959)
- German Type IX submarine (French: Unterseeboot type IX)
  - Blaison (ex U-123)
  - Bouan (ex U-510)
- Type XXI submarine (Germany) (1946–1967)
  - Roland Morillot (ex U-2518)
- Type XXIII submarine (Germany) (1946)
  - U-2326
- Saphir class (United Kingdom) (1951–1959)
  - Sibylle (ex – HMS Sportsman)
  - Saphir (ex – HMS Satyr)
  - Sirène (ex – HMS Spiteful)
  - Sultane (ex – HMS Statesman)
- Narval class (1957–1992)
  - Narval (Q231)
  - Marsouin (Q232)
  - Dauphin (Q233)
  - Requin (Q234)
  - Espadon (Q237)
  - Morse (Q238)
- Aréthuse class (1958–1981)
  - Argonaute (Q235)
  - Aréthuse (Q236)
  - Amazone (Q239)
  - Ariane (Q240)
- Daphné class (1964–1996)
  - Daphné (Q241)
  - Diane (Q242)
  - Doris (Q243)
  - Eurydice (Q245)
  - Flore (Q246)
  - Galatée (Q247)
  - Minerve (Q248)
  - Junon (Q249)
  - Vénus (Q250)
  - Psyché (Q253)
  - Sirène (Q254)
- Gymnote (Q251) (1966–1986)

=== 1971 to present ===
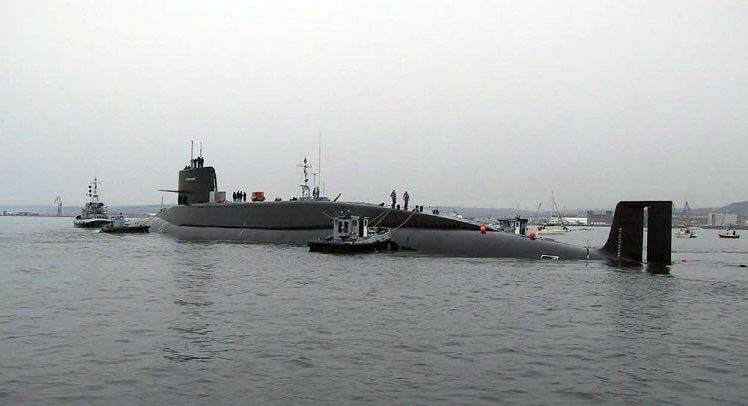
Redoutable

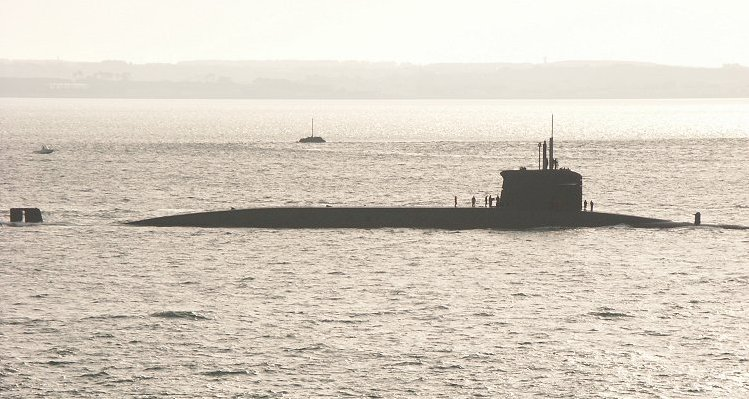
Inflexible

- Redoutable class (1971–2008)
  - Le Redoutable (Q252) (1971–1991)
  - Le Terrible (Q255) (1973–1996)
  - Le Foudroyant (Q257) (1974–1998)
  - L'Indomptable (1976–2005)
  - Le Tonnant (1980–1999)
  - L'Inflexible (1985–2008)
- Agosta class (1977–2001)
  - Agosta (1977–1997)
  - Bévéziers (1977–1998)
  - La Praya (1978–2000)
  - Ouessant (1978–2001)
- Rubis class (1984–)
  - Saphir (S602) (1984–2019)
  - Rubis (S601) (1983–2022)
  - Casabianca (S603) (1987–2023)
  - Émeraude (S604) (1988–2024)
  - Perle (S606) (1993–2026)

== See also ==
- List of active French Navy ships
- List of Escorteurs of the French Navy
- List of battleships of France
- List of aircraft carriers of France
- List of French Air and Space Force aircraft squadrons
