= Romanian submarines of World War II =

During the Second World War, the Royal Romanian Navy operated a total of 9 submarines: three fleet submarines and six midget submarines. These vessels fought on the Axis side during the war. Only two of them survived the war and continued to serve in the Romanian Navy until the 1960s.

== Background ==
The first submarine ordered by Romania was part of the 1912 naval program. She was ordered from Italy, along with the four Vifor-class destroyers, however she was requisitioned by the Italian authorities in 1914 and never delivered to Romania. A second order, for a class of three 340-ton submarines, was placed in France during the First World War. However, these too were requisitioned by the French Navy and commissioned in 1921 as the O'Byrne class. These three boats became the first class of French submarines to be completed between 1919 and 1944.

== Delfinul ==
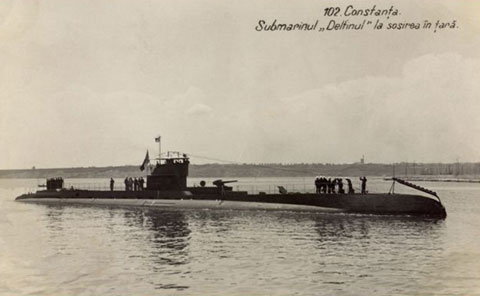
Delfinul, the only Axis submarine in the Black Sea in 1941.

The first submarine to be ordered and actually commissioned by the Romanian Navy was Delfinul. She was ordered in 1927 from the Italian naval base and shipyard at Fiume (today Rijeka, Croatia). A second boat of this class was also planned, but not laid down. She was completed in 1931, but was accepted by Romania as the country's first submarine only in 1936, after the many corrections required by the Romanians were completed. Delfinul had a surfaced displacement of 650 tons, which grew to 900 tons when submerged. The boat measured 68 meters (223 ft) in length, with a beam of 5.9 meters (19 ft) and a draught of 3.6 meters (12 ft). Her power plant consisted of two Sulzer diesel engines and two electric motors powering two shafts, giving her a top speed of 14 knots (26 km/h; 16 mph) on the surface and 9 knots (17 km/h; 10 mph) submerged. Her crew amounted to 55. She was armed with eight 533 mm (21 in) torpedo tubes (4 bow and 4 stern), one 102 mm (4 in) deck gun and one twin 13 mm (0.51 in) machine gun. After the 23 August 1944 coup, the submarine was confiscated by Soviet forces and commissioned as TS-3 on 20 October 1944. After a short career in the Soviet Navy, it was decommissioned on 12 October 1945. The submarine was eventually returned to Romania in 1951 and stricken in 1957.

=== Wartime achievements ===
Delfinul had a significant contribution to the Romanian victory during the 26 June 1941 Raid on Constanța. During her first sortie of the war, she spotted the advancing Soviet warships hours before they reached the Romanian port, enabling the port's defenses to be ready and alert upon their arrival.

On 20 August 1941, towards the end of her third sortie, Delfinul was missed with a torpedo by the Soviet M-class submarine M-33, four miles off Constanţa. The Romanian submarine swiftly counterattacked with her twin 13 mm machine gun, causing the Soviet submarine to submerge and retreat.

In the early hours of 6 November 1941, during her fifth sortie, Delfinul torpedoed and sank the Soviet 1,975-ton cargo ship Uralets four miles South of Yalta. The submarine was subsequently attacked by Soviet forces but she followed a route along the Turkish coast and managed to evade up to 80 depth charges, before safely arriving in the port of Constanța on 7 November.

== Marsuinul ==
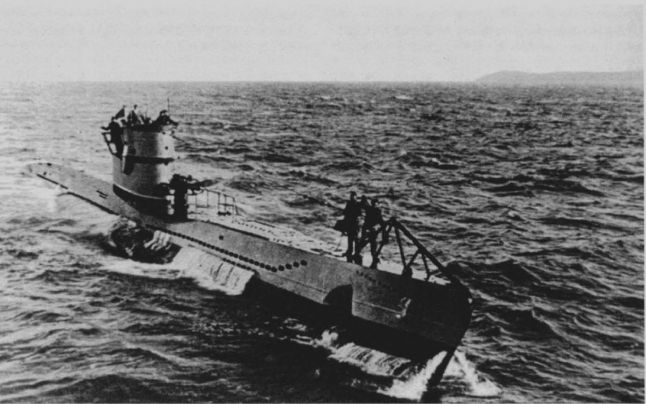
Marsuinul

Marsuinul was designed by NV Ingenieurskantoor voor Scheepsbouw in the Hague. She was laid down at the Galați shipyard in Romania in 1938 and launched on 4 May 1941. She had a standard (surfaced) displacement of 620 tons, a length of 58 meters, a beam of 5.6 meters and a draught of 3.6 meters. Her power plant consisted of two MAN diesel engines and two electric motors, powering two shafts which gave her a top speed of 16 knots on surface and 9 knots in immersion. She was armed with one 105 mm naval gun, one 37 mm anti-aircraft gun and six 533 mm torpedo tubes (four in the bow and two in the stern). She was captured by Soviet forces after the 23 August 1944 coup and commissioned as TS-2 on 20 October. She was sunk at Poti on 20 February 1945 by the accidental explosion of one of her own torpedoes.

=== Wartime achievements ===
Marsuinul was commissioned in May 1943. She spent almost a year undergoing sea drills and tests, only being declared ready for action in April 1944. She carried out only one patrol mission, between 11 and 27 May 1944, along the Turkish coast, between Eregli and Trabzon, and near the Soviet port of Batumi. During her sortie, on 20 May, a Soviet submarine launched a torpedo at her, which missed. This was the second and last engagement between a Soviet submarine and a Romanian submarine.

== Rechinul ==
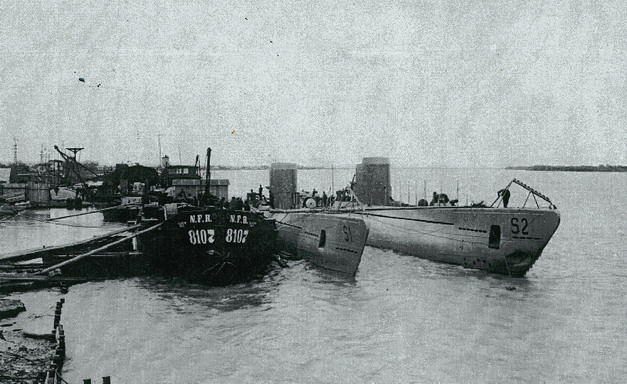
Rechinul (left) and Marsuinul (right).

Rechinul was a minelaying submarine, also designed by Ingenieurskantoor voor Scheepsbouw (IvS) and built at the Galați shipyard in Romania. She was also laid down in 1938 and launched on 22 May 1941. She had the same power plant as her sister, with a slightly faster surface top speed of 17 knots, due to her standard (surfaced) displacement of 585 tons (35 tons lighter than her sister). Her submerged top speed was however the same, 9 knots. She was armed with four 533 mm torpedo tubes, one 20 mm anti-aircraft gun and could carry up to 40 mines. Rechinul was also captured by Soviet forces after the 23 August 1944 coup, and commissioned as TS-1 on 20 October 1944. She was returned to Romania in 1951. She was withdrawn from active service by 1961 and finally scrapped in 1967.

=== Wartime achievements ===
Rechinul's career was more eventful than her sister's, as she carried out two patrol missions. Her first mission took place during the 1944 evacuation of the Crimea, between 20 April and 15 May. Initially, she was only tasked with patrolling the Turkish coast, but on 30 April, she was tasked with the surveillance of the Soviet port of Batumi. The information on Soviet naval movements she transmitted during her mission proved to be very useful to the German and Romanian ships which were carrying out the evacuation of Sevastopol. Her second and last mission consisted in a patrol off the Soviet port of Novorossyisk, between 15 June and 27 July. She was heavily pursued and hunted by Soviet forces, but just like her sister, she managed to return to Constanța without any losses. This was the last Romanian submarine patrol of the war, and with a length of over 40 days, the longest in Romanian submarine history.

== CB-class midget submarines ==
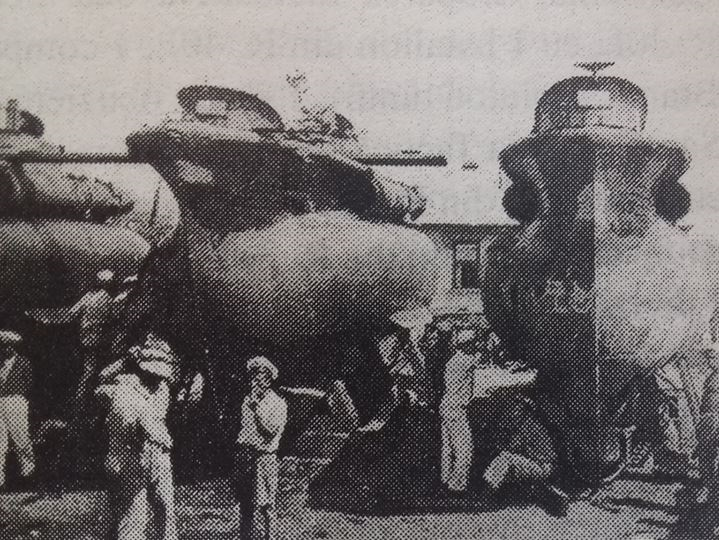
The Italian Black Sea midget submarines under Romanian control, late 1943.

The submarines were designed and built by Caproni. They were used as coastal defence units, being a significant improvement of the previous CA-class. Each unit had a standard (surfaced) displacement of 35.4 tons and a submerged displacement of 44.3 tons. They measured 15 meters in length, had a beam of 3 meters and a draught of 2.05 meters. Power plant consisted of one Isotta Fraschini diesel engine and one Brown Boveri electric motor, both generating a total of 130 hp powering a single shaft, resulting in a surfaced top speed on 7.5 knots and a submerged top speed of 7 knots. Each boat was armed with two externally-mounted 450 mm torpedoes, each tube could be reloaded without removing the vessel from water. The two torpedoes could also be replaced by two mines. Each boat had a crew of four, aided in navigation by a small conning tower.

The first six boats, completed in 1941, were transferred to the Black Sea by rail, after Nazi Germany asked for Italian naval support on the Eastern Front. They departed on 25 April 1942 and reached the Romanian port of Constanța on 2 May. They formed the 1st Squadriglia Sommergibili CB, under the overall command of Francesco Mimbelli. They fought against the Soviet Black Sea Fleet, CB-5 being sunk at Yalta in June 1942, either by Soviet aircraft or by a torpedo boat. In late 1942, the remaining five submarines were refitted at the Constanța Shipyard in Romania. On 26 August 1943, CB-4 torpedoed and sank the Soviet Shchuka-class submarine Shch-203.

After the Allied armistice with Italy in September 1943, the five Black Sea submarines (CB-1, CB-2, CB-3, CB-4 and CB-6) were transferred to the Royal Romanian Navy. They were all scuttled in the Black Sea in August 1944, after King Michael's Coup, but at least four of them were subsequently raised and commissioned by the Soviet Navy.

Four of the Black Sea submarines (CB-1, CB-2, CB-3 and CB-4) were captured by Soviet forces in August 1944 and commissioned on 20 October as TM-4, TM-5, TM-6 and TM-7. They were stricken on 16 February 1945 and subsequently scrapped.

== Support ships ==
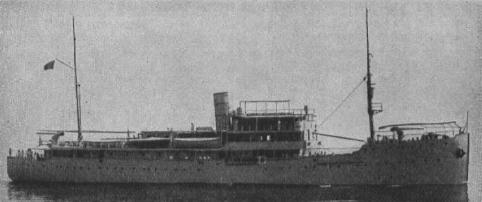
The submarine tender Constanța.

Constanța was one of the earliest purpose-built submarine tenders. She was commissioned in 1931, ahead of Germany's first purpose-built submarine tender, Saar. Constanța was laid down in August 1927 at the Italian Quarnaro Shipyard in Fiume, being completed in 1931. She measured 77.7 meters in length, having a beam of 11.2 meters and a draught of 4 meters. She was fitted with torpedo storing and loading facilities, engineering workshops, and submarine salvage and signalling facilities. She was powered by two diesel engines which gave her a top speed of 13 knots. Her armament consisted of two 76 mm Armstrong naval/AA guns, two 20 mm anti-aircraft guns and two twin 13 mm machine guns. She had a crew of 136 and a range of over 10,000 nautical miles. She was the largest purpose-built warship of the World War II Romanian Navy, her full displacement amounting to 2,200 tons (1,350 tons standard).
