= French submarine La Vestale =

Argonaute-class submarine, French Navy, 1934

History

France
- Name: La Vestale
- Namesake: Vestal Virgin, a priestess of the goddess Vesta in ancient Rome
- Builder: Chantiers Schneider et Cie, Chalon-sur-Saône, France
- Laid down: 30 January 1931
- Launched: 22, 25, or 26 May 1932 (see text)
- Commissioned: 18 September 1934
- Stricken: 14 August 1946
- Fate: Sold for scrapping 14 August 1946

General characteristics
- Type: Submarine
- Displacement: 630 tonnes (620 long tons) surfaced; 798 tonnes (785 long tons) submerged
- Length: 63.4 m (208 ft)
- Beam: 6.4 m (21 ft)
- Draught: 4.24 m (13.9 ft)
- Propulsion: 2 × Schneider-Carel diesel engines, 1,300 bhp (969 kW); 2 × electric motors, 1,000 shp (746 kW); 2 shafts
- Speed: 14 knots (26 km/h; 16 mph) surfaced; 9 knots (17 km/h; 10 mph) submerged
- Range: 4,000 nmi (7,400 km) at 10 knots (19 km/h; 12 mph) surfaced; 82 nmi (152 km) at 5 knots (9.3 km/h; 5.8 mph) submerged
- Test depth: 80 m (260 ft)
- Complement: 41
- Armament: 6 × 550 mm (22 in) torpedo tubes; 2 × 400 mm (16 in) torpedo tubes; 1 × 75 mm (3 in) deck gun; 1 × 8 mm (0.31 in) machine gun

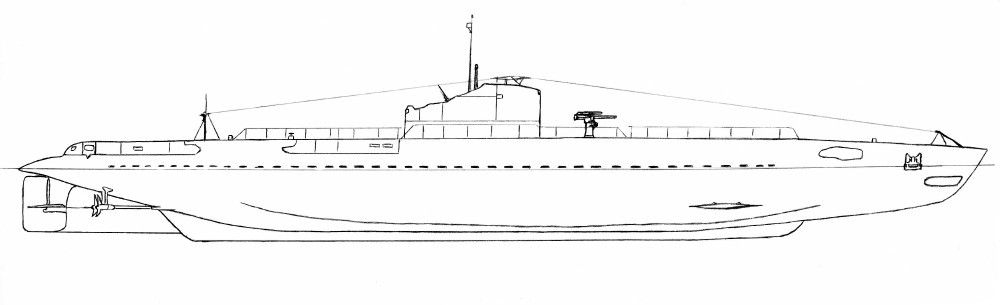
Argonaute-class submarine sketch

La Vestale (Q176) was an Argonaute-class submarine commissioned into service in the French Navy in 1933. She saw service in World War II, first on the side of the Allies from September 1939 to June 1940, then in the forces of Vichy France until November 1942, when she became part of the Free French Naval Forces. She was stricken in 1946.

French sources sometimes refer to the submarine simply as Vestale, either instead of or interchangeably with La Vestale.

== Construction and commissioning ==
La Vestale was authorized in the 1929 naval program. Laid down by Chantiers Schneider et Cie at Chalon-sur-Saône, France, on 30 January 1931 with the pennant number Q176, she was launched on 22, 25, or 26 May 1932, according to different sources. She experienced a delay during her journey under tow to Toulon, France, on the Rhône in early October 1933 when she was forced to wait at Lafarre for 48 hours while the river was in flood. She was commissioned on 18 September 1934 at Toulon.

== Service history ==
=== French Navy ===
When World War II began with Nazi Germany′s invasion of Poland on 1 September 1939, La Vestale was stationed at Bizerte in Tunisia as part of the 17th Submarine Division in the 6th Squadron, a component of the 4th Flotilla in Maritime Prefecture IV. Also in the division were her sister ships and Aréthuse, Atalante, and La Sultane. France entered the war on 3 September 1939.

The Battle of France began when German ground forces advanced into France, the Netherlands, Belgium, and Luxembourg on 10 May 1940. Italy declared war on France on 10 June 1940 and joined the invasion. La Vestale was among nine submarines scheduled to depart Toulon on 18 June 1940 bound for French North Africa, but the departure never took place and all nine submarines remained at Toulon.

The Battle of France ended in France's defeat and armistices with Germany on 22 June and with Italy on 24 June, both of which went into effect on 25 June 1940. On that day, La Vestale was at Toulon.

=== Vichy France ===
After the June 1940 armistice, La Vestale served in the naval forces of Vichy France. On 9 December 1940, the 17th Submarine Division — now reduced to La Vestale, Aréthuse, and La Sultane — departed Toulon in company with the submarine Archimède and the Élan-class sloop-of-war Commandant Bory bound for Casablanca in French Morocco, which they reached on 16 December. From Casablanca, the 17th Submarine Division proceeded to Dakar in Senegal. Atalante later joined them there and again became part of the division.

While operating from Dakar, La Vestale and Atalante both sustained diesel engine damage that could not be repaired in French West Africa. The two submarines departed Dakar on 22 August 1941 bound for southern French Morocco, where Atalante called at Agadir from 23 to 29 August 1941 before rendezvousing with La Vestale at Safi on 30 August. The two submarines arrived at Casablanca on 31 August 1941.

On 4 March 1942, the four submarines of the 17th Submarine Division departed Casablanca bound for Toulon, where they were to undergo streamlining. Along the way, La Vestale called at Oran in Algeria in April 1942. With the work completed on all four of its submarines, the 17th Submarine Division departed Toulon on 30 September 1942 to return to Casablanca.

La Vestale is recorded as having been at sea in the Atlantic on 1 November 1942 during a voyage from Casablanca to Dakar in company with Aréthuse, Atalante, and La Sultane.

On 8 November 1942, Allied forces landed in French North Africa in Operation Torch. Fighting between Allied and Vichy French forces ended on 11 November 1942.

=== Free France ===
After the cessation of hostilities between Allied and French forces in French North Africa, French forces in Africa, including La Vestale, joined the forces of Free France. La Vestale became a unit of the Free French Naval Forces.

On 18 May 1943, La Vestale departed Oran for Algiers in Algeria with a convoy made up of the French fleet tanker Drôme, a British minesweeper, and three small British patrol boats. Some time later, Drôme, escorted by one of the patrol boats, detached from the convoy to proceed separately to Ténès, Algeria. At 17:00, the minesweeper reported damage and was left behind. During the predawn hours of 19 May 1943, the British destroyer HMS Wishart approached La Vestale and, mistaking her for a German U-boat, attacked her. La Vestale sustained massive damage to her stern and suffered one man killed and several wounded. She was towed to port, where it was decided to repair her using parts from La Sultane or from a refloated submarine.

In November 1943, La Vestale was at Oran and still was part the 17th Submarine Division along with Aréthuse, Atalante, and La Sultane. In 1944, she was one of five French second-class submarines still operational, along with Amazone, Curie, Doris, and La Sultane. In August 1945, when World War II ended with the surrender of Japan, she was part of the Oran Submarine Group, waiting to be placed in reserve.

On 14 August 1946, La Vestale was stricken from the navy list and sold for scrapping.

== See also ==
- List of submarines of France
- French submarines of World War II
