= O'Byrne-class submarine =

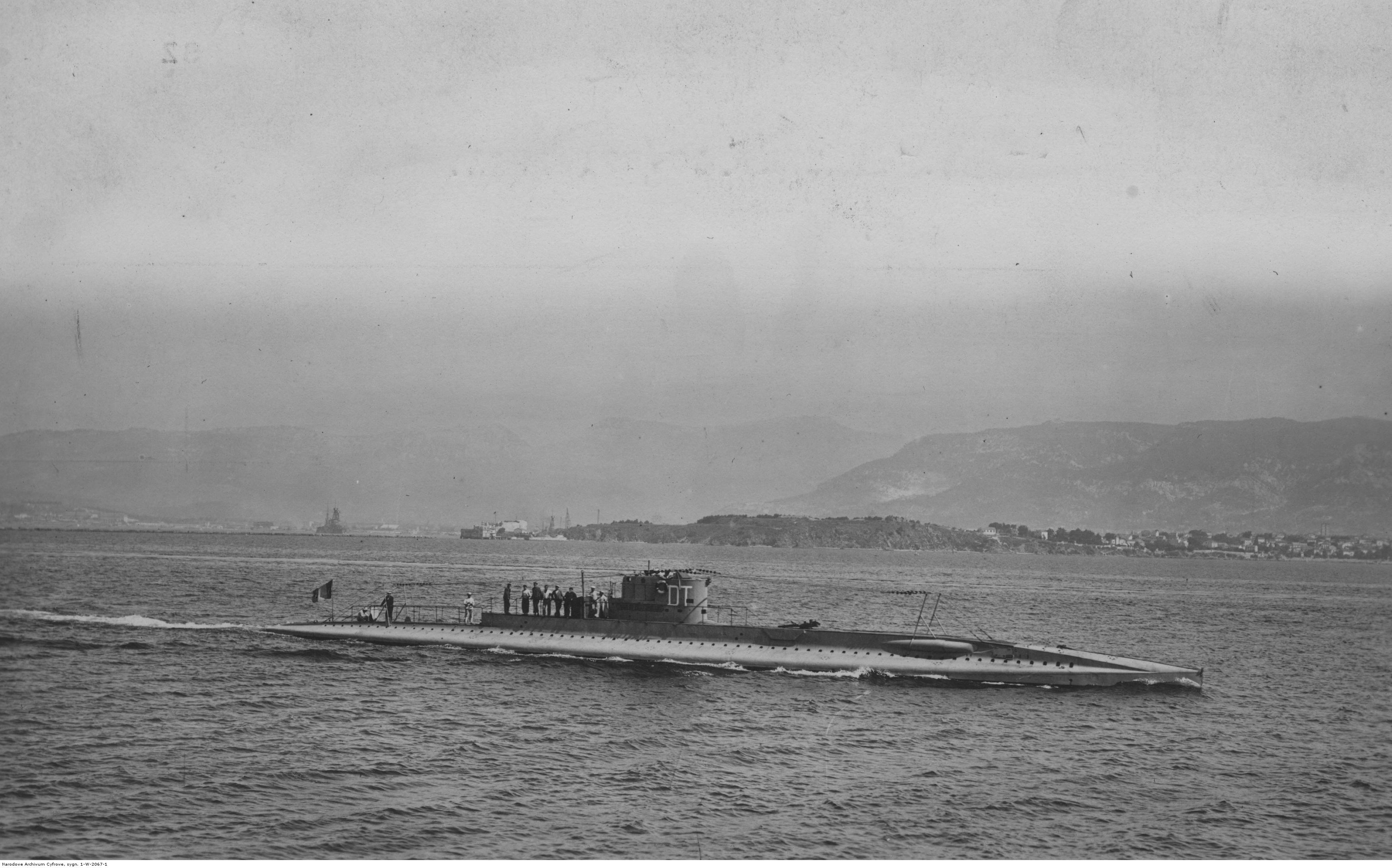
- Louis Dupetit-Thouars, date unknown

Class overview
- Name: O'Byrne class
- Builders: Schneider et Cie
- Operators: French Navy
- Preceded by: Type UB II
- Succeeded by: 600 Series
- Built: 1917–1920
- In service: 1921–1935
- Completed: 3
- Retired: 3

General characteristics
- Type: Submarine
- Displacement: 342 tons (surfaced)
- Length: 52.4 m (171 ft 11 in)
- Beam: 4.7 m (15 ft 5 in)
- Draught: 2.7 m (8 ft 10 in)
- Propulsion: 2 Schneider diesel engines, 2 electric motors, 2 shafts
- Speed: 14 knots (26 km/h; 16 mph) (surfaced)
- Range: 1,850 nmi (3,430 km; 2,130 mi) at 10 knots (19 km/h; 12 mph)
- Complement: 25
- Armament: 1 × 47 mm (1.9 in) Hotchkiss deck gun; 4 × 450 mm (17.7 in) torpedo tubes

The O'Byrne-class submarines were a class of three submarines built for the French Navy from 1917 to 1921. They were originally ordered by the Romanian Navy, but were confiscated by the French government while still under construction. Three ships of the type were built between 1917 and 1921 at the Schneider shipyard in Chalon-sur-Saône. They were commissioned in the French Navy, serving in the Mediterranean Sea. The ships were removed from the Navy list between 1928 and 1935. The first ship of its class was named in honour of French submariner Gabriel O'Byrne.

== Construction and specifications ==
O'Byrne and her two sister ships (Henri Fournier and Louis Dupetit-Thouars) were ordered by the Romanian Government from the Schneider Shipyard in Chalon-sur-Saône, being laid down in April 1917. However France seized the submarines for its navy during World War I. The three submarines were subsequently completed for the French Navy, with larger bridges and conning towers. O'Byrne was the first to be launched (22 May 1919), followed by Henri Fournier (30 September 1919) and Louis Dupetit-Thouars (12 May 1920). They were completed and commissioned in 1921.

Each of the three submarines had a surfaced displacement of 342 tons, measuring 52.4 metres (171 ft 11 in) in length, with a beam of 4.7 metres (15 ft 5 in) and a draught of 2.7 metres (8 ft 10 in). The power plant consisted of two Schneider diesel engines and two electric motors powering two shafts, resulting in a surfaced top speed of 14 knots (26 km/h; 16 mph). Each vessel had a range of 1,850 nautical miles (3,430 km; 2,130 mi) at 10 knots (19 km/h; 12 mph) and a crew of 25. Armament consisted of four 450 mm torpedo tubes and one 47 mm deck gun.

== Service ==
The three boats incorporated lessons from the French war experience, and thus proved to be reasonably successful. They served in the Mediterranean after World War I, but their careers were uneventful, and they were taken out of service before the start of World War II. Louis Dupetit-Thouars was stricken in November 1928 and her two sister ships in August 1935.

The O'Byrne-class submarines were originally ordered by the Romanian Navy, but were confiscated by the French government while still under construction. Had O'Byrne been delivered to Romania upon completion, she would have become the first Romanian submarine. This role would be fulfilled by the Italian-built Delfinul in 1936.

== Ships ==
O'Byrne-class submarines
Name	Laid down	Launched	Completed	Fate
O'Byrne	April 1917	22 May 1919	1921	Sold for scrap in 1935.
Henri Fournier	April 1917	30 September 1919	1921	Sold for scrap in 1935
Louis Dupetit-Thouars	April 1917	12 May 1920	1921	Sold for scrap in 1928
