= French submarine Curie =

Two submarines of the French Navy have borne the name Curie in honour of Pierre and Marie Curie.

- French submarine Curie (Q87), a submarine of the Brumaire class; laid down on 18 July 1912; served in the First World War. She was scrapped in 1923.
- French submarine Curie (P67), the former HMS Vox, a U-class submarine of the Royal Navy transferred to the Free French Navy in World War II in 1943; returned to the British in 1946; scrapped in 1949
