= Thouars (disambiguation) =

Thouars may refer to:

- Thouars, taxonomic authority abbreviation for Louis-Marie Aubert du Petit-Thouars
- Thouars, a town in France
- List of viscounts of Thouars
- du Petit-Thouars
- French ship Dupetit-Thouars
