= French ship Dupetit-Thouars =

Six ships of the French navy have borne the name Dupetit-Thouars in honour of Aristide Aubert du Petit-Thouars, hero of the Battle of the Nile:

- A bomb longboat (1799)
- Dupetit-Thouars, a brig which served in the French intervention in Mexico (1828–1865)
- Dupetit-Thouars, a cruiser (1867–1897)
- Dupetit-Thouars, a Gueydon-class armoured cruiser (1901–1918)
- Louis Dupetit-Thouars, an O'Byrne-class submarine (1920–1928)
- Dupetit-Thouars (D625), a T 47-class destroyer (1956–1988)

== See also ==
- Du Petit-Thouars
