= French submarine Aréthuse (NN7) =

Argonaute-class submarine, French Navy, 1933

History

France
- Name: Aréthuse
- Namesake: Arethusa, a nymph in Greek mythology
- Ordered: 14 April 1927
- Builder: Chantiers Schneider et Cie, Chalon-sur-Saône, France
- Laid down: 6 January 1928
- Launched: 8 August 1929
- Commissioned: 14 July 1933
- Decommissioned: 1944
- Fate: Condemned 25 March 1946

General characteristics
- Type: Submarine
- Displacement: 630 tonnes (620 long tons) surfaced; 798 tonnes (785 long tons) submerged
- Length: 63.4 m (208 ft)
- Beam: 6.4 m (21 ft)
- Draught: 4.24 m (13.9 ft)
- Propulsion: 2 × Schneider-Carel diesel engines, 1,300 bhp (969 kW); 2 × electric motors, 1,000 shp (746 kW); 2 shafts
- Speed: 14 knots (26 km/h; 16 mph) surfaced; 9 knots (17 km/h; 10 mph) submerged
- Range: 4,000 nmi (7,400 km) at 10 knots (19 km/h; 12 mph) surfaced; 82 nmi (152 km) at 5 knots (9.3 km/h; 5.8 mph) submerged
- Test depth: 80 m (260 ft)
- Complement: 41
- Armament: 6 × 550 mm (22 in) torpedo tubes; 2 × 400 mm (16 in) torpedo tubes; 1 × 75 mm (3 in) deck gun; 1 × 8 mm (0.31 in) machine gun

Aréthuse (NN7) was an Argonaute-class submarine commissioned into service in the French Navy in 1933. She saw service in World War II, first on the side of the Allies from September 1939 to June 1940, then in the forces of Vichy France until November 1942, when she became part of the Free French Naval Forces. She was condemned in 1946.

== Construction and commissioning ==
Aréthuse was authorized in the 1926 naval program and ordered on 14 April 1927. Laid down by Chantiers Schneider et Cie at Chalon-sur-Saône, France, on 6 January 1928 with the pennant number NN7, she was launched on 8 August 1929. She was commissioned on 14 July 1933.

== Service history ==
=== French Navy ===
When World War II began with Nazi Germany′s invasion of Poland on 1 September 1939, Aréthuse was undergoing a refit at Toulon, France, while stationed at Bizerte in Tunisia as part of the 17th Submarine Division in the 6th Squadron, a component of the 4th Flotilla in Maritime Prefecture IV. Also in the division were her sister ships Atalante, La Sultane, and La Vestale. France entered the war on 3 September 1939.

The Battle of France began when German ground forces advanced into France, the Netherlands, Belgium, and Luxembourg on 10 May 1940. Italy declared war on France on 10 June 1940 and joined the invasion. Aréthuse was among nine submarines scheduled to depart Toulon on 18 June 1940 bound for French North Africa, but the departure never took place and all nine submarines remained at Toulon.

The Battle of France ended in France's defeat and armistice with Germany and Italy, which went into effect on 25 June 1940. On that day, Aréthuse was at Toulon.

=== Vichy France ===
After the June 1940 armistice, Aréthuse served in the naval forces of Vichy France. On 9 December 1940, the 17th Submarine Division — now reduced to Aréthuse, La Sultane, and La Vestale — departed Toulon in company with the submarine Archimède and the Élan-class sloop-of-war Commandant Bory bound for Casablanca in French Morocco, which they reached on 16 December. From Casablanca, the 17th Submarine Division proceeded to Dakar in Senegal. Atalante later joined them there and again became part of the division.

While Aréthuse was operating from Dakar, her main electric motor broke down in January 1941, requiring armature repairs that could not be made at Dakar. On 10 February 1941, she departed Dakar bound for Casablanca in French Morocco, where she underwent repairs. On 18 April 1941, she carried out post-repair trials, including a test dive to a depth of 60 metres (197 ft). She and the submarine Thétis then toured ports in French Morocco, visiting Safi from 25 to 27 April, Agadir on 28 April, Mogador on 29 and 30 April, and Safi again on 1 May before returning to Casablanca on 2 May 1941. From 18 to 23 May, Aréthuse again called at Agadir, and she visited Port-Lyautey from 3 to 5 June 1941.

On 6 August 1941, Aréthuse and La Sultane got underway from Casablanca. They arrived at Port-Lyautey the same day for a port call that lasted until 10 August.

On 12 September 1941, Aréthuse and La Sultane departed Casablanca bound for Safi, where they arrived at the end of the day. Aréthuse departed Safi on 16 September and made for Agadir, where she arrived on 17 September. Her stay at Agadir ended on 22 September 1941, when she got underway for Casablanca. Aréthuse again called at Safi from 13 to 17 February 1942.

On 4 March 1942, the four submarines of the 17th Submarine Division departed Casablanca bound for Toulon where they were to undergo streamlining. Aréthuse was decommissioned for this work in April 1942, then recommissioned on 31 August 1942 after its completion. With the work completed on all four of its submarines, the 17th Submarine Division departed Toulon on 30 September 1942 to return to Casablanca.

Aréthuse is recorded as having been at sea in the Atlantic on 1 November 1942 during a voyage from Casablanca to Dakar in company with Atalante, La Sultane, and La Vestale.

On 8 November 1942, Allied forces landed in French North Africa in Operation Torch. Fighting between Allied and Vichy French forces ended on 11 November 1942.

=== Free France ===
After the cessation of hostilities between Allied and French forces in French North Africa, French forces in Africa, including Aréthuse, joined the forces of Free France. As a unit of the Free French Naval Forces, Aréthuse was at the submarine base at Oran in Algeria on 1 April 1943. She was participating in an exercise in the Bay of Arzew off Arzew, Algeria, on 20 April 1943 when the ships of an Allied convoy mistook her for an Axis submarine and opened gunfire on her.

On 10 January 1943, the British submarine HMS Unseen had torpedoed the Vichy French 6,672-gross register ton steam cargo ship SS Dalny, which then ran aground on the coast of Sardinia near Porto Cervo at 41°08′N 009°32′E; Unseen had again torpedoed the stranded ship on 11 January 1943. Dalny had just been refloated when Aréthuse arrived on the scene on 4 June 1943 and at 10:45 fired two torpedoes at Dalny, either sinking or further damaging her, according to different sources. The Royal Netherlands Navy submarine HNLMS Dolfijn later torpedoed the wreck of Dalny at 12:00 on 15 September 1943, one source placing this attack off Corsica.

In September 1943, Aréthuse and the submarine Perle transported food to Ajaccio on Corsica. On 28 September 1943, Aréthuse disembarked five agents and picked up seven (including Colonel Henri Zeller) at Cap Camarat on the coast of Southern France. By 9 November 1943, Aréthuse was part of the Algerian Submarine Group at Oran.

On 3 January 1944, Aréthuse replaced the submarine Casabianca in her sector. On 9 January 1944, the British submarine HMS Unseen departed Algiers in Algeria and with Aréthuse made a passage to Gibraltar as part of Convoy MKS 36.

At the end of 1944, Aréthuse became a training ship. Based at Dakar, she performed services at the sound schools at Freetown in Sierra Leone and at Takoradi on the Gold Coast.

Aréthuse was at La Pallice, France, in July 1945. She was condemned on 26 March 1946.

== See also ==
- List of submarines of France
- French submarines of World War II
