= French submarine X =

Experimental submarine, launched 1904

X
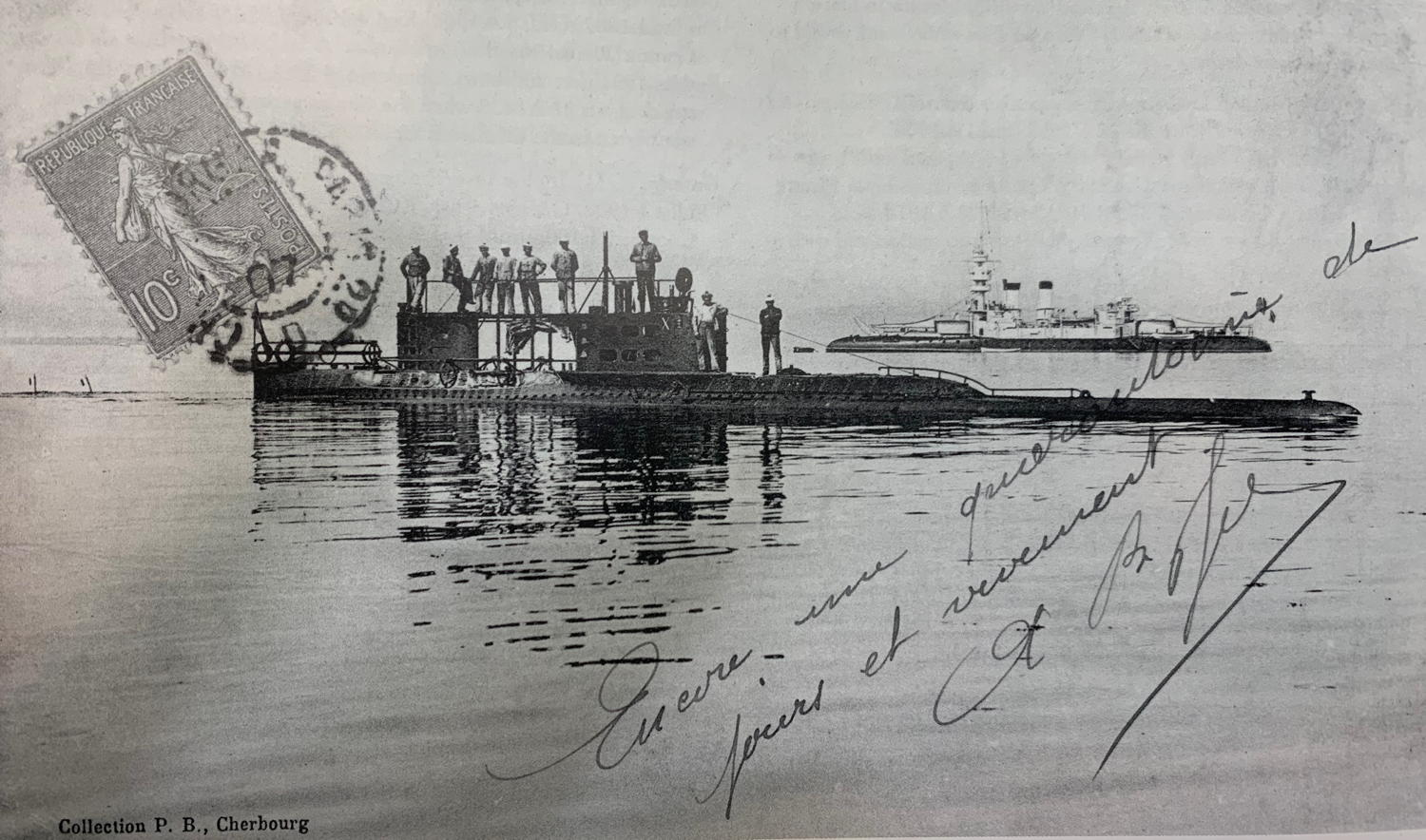
- A French post card of X, date unknown. The submarine's bow is on the right. A Jemmapes-class coast-defense ship is in the background.

Class overview
- Name: X
- Operators: French Navy
- Preceded by: Y
- Succeeded by: Aigrette class
- Built: 1903–1905
- In service: 1905–1913
- Completed: 1

History
- Ordered: 10 January 1902
- Builder: Arsenal de Cherbourg
- Laid down: 20 April 1903
- Launched: 15 November 1904
- Commissioned: 18 December 1905
- Decommissioned: 1 June 1913
- Renamed: Dauphin, 13 February 1911
- Stricken: 21 May 1914
- Fate: Sold for scrap, 1922

General characteristics
- Type: Submarine
- Displacement: 165 long tons (168 t) (surfaced); 180 long tons (183 t) (submerged)
- Length: 37.7 m (123 ft 8 in) (o/a)
- Beam: 3.1 m (10 ft 2 in)
- Draught: 2.4 m (7 ft 10 in)
- Installed power: 2 × motor-generators, 230–260 PS (169–191 kW)
- Propulsion: 2 × variable-pitch propellers
- Speed: 8.4 knots (15.6 km/h; 9.7 mph) (surfaced); 6.2 knots (11.5 km/h; 7.1 mph) (submerged)
- Range: 170 nmi (310 km; 200 mi) at 8 knots (15 km/h; 9.2 mph) (surfaced); 60 nmi (110 km; 69 mi) at 4.5 knots (8.3 km/h; 5.2 mph) (submerged)
- Complement: 15 men
- Armament: 1 × 450 mm (17.7 in) bow torpedo tube; 2 × 450 mm (17.7 in) Drzewiecki drop collar torpedo launchers; 1 × 450 mm (17.7 in) external torpedo cradle

X was an experimental submarine built for the French Navy (Marine nationale) during the first decade of the 20th century. Designed by Gaston Romazzotti, she was shaped like the letter Y with two sterns, making her the first submarine with two propeller shafts. The boat was completed in 1905 and spent the next two years conducting her sea trials. X was renamed Dauphin (Dolphin) in 1911. Her internal-combustion engines proved unreliable and she was decommissioned in 1913 and struck from the navy list the following year. The submarine was not used during the First World War and was sold for scrap in 1922.

== Background and description ==
The naval architect and constructor Gaston Romazzotti proposed in late 1900 to build a single-hull submarine with an experimental closed-cycle diesel engine that could propel the boat both on the surface in normal fashion and underwater using compressed air. The submarine was about the same size and was expected to have similar performance as the Naïade class. His proposal was accepted by the Board of Construction (Conseil des travaux) and approved by Navy Minister Jean Marie Antoine de Lanessan with the name X.

Romazotti totally revamped his design the following year, deciding upon a more conventional design better capable of offensive operations than the slow and short-ranged Naïades. The internal arrangements and propulsion machinery were based on those of the Naïades, but the hull design was radically different. Forward it had the standard circular-profile shape, transitioned amidships into a shape like the infinity symbol ∞ and then split into two circular-profile hulls, one for each propeller shaft and its propulsion machinery. This made X the first submarine to have two propeller shafts.

X had an overall length of 37.7 metres (123 ft 8 in), a beam of 3.1 metres (10 ft 2 in) and a draught of 2.4 metres (7 ft 10 in). The boat had a surfaced displacement of 165 long tons (168 t) and a submerged displacement of 180 long tons (183 t). She had three sets of diving planes, one at the bow, one amidships and the third at the stern. a complement of 2 officers and 13 ratings. X was fitted with a telescoping tower that elevated the captain above the hull until the submarine was fully submerged. To improve the crew's endurance, Romazotti provided an external platform 4 metres (13 ft 1 in) long and 2 metres (6 ft 7 in) above the hull where they could get fresh air. Her armament comprised one 450-millimetre (17.7 in) torpedo tube in the bow, two external 450 mm Drzewiecki drop-collar launchers and one external 450 mm cradle aft that was aimed to the rear. No reloads were provided.

The submarine had two shafts, each powered by a Panhard & Levassor benzole engine for surface running with a designed combined total of 260 metric horsepower (191 kW) and two Sautter, Harlé electric motors which together produced 230 metric horsepower (170 kW) for submerged propulsion. Her designed maximum speeds were 10.5 knots (19.4 km/h; 12.1 mph) on the surface and 5.5 knots (10.2 km/h; 6.3 mph) while submerged. During her sea trials in early 1905, X reached 8.4 knots (15.6 km/h; 9.7 mph) from 219 horsepower (163 kW) on the surface and 6.2 knots (11.5 km/h; 7.1 mph) from 163 horsepower (122 kW) while submerged. The boat had a surfaced range of 170 nautical miles (310 km; 200 mi) at 8 knots (15 km/h; 9.2 mph) and a submerged range of 60 nautical miles (110 km; 69 mi) at 4.5 knots (8.3 km/h; 5.2 mph).

== Construction and career ==
X was ordered on 10 January 1902 with the budget number Q 35 from the Arsenal de Cherbourg. She was laid down on 20 April 1903 and launched on 15 November 1904. The submarine began her sea trials in January 1905 and was commissioned on 18 December 1905, although her trials lasted into 1907. X was estimated to cost 499,500 francs.

The submarine made two significant voyages in her career, Brest to Cherbourg and Cherbourg to Dunkirk. During the second transit in April 1906, both benzole engines broke down, one with a cracked cylinder and the other with a broken crankshaft; neither had been repaired as of 1907, which limited her to electric power only. By 1907, her surface range was no more than 55 nmi (102 km; 63 mi) and her submerged range was only 40 nmi (74 km; 46 mi). On 13 February 1911, X was renamed Dauphin. The submarine served in the English Channel until she was decommissioned on 1 June 1913. The boat was struck from the navy list on 21 May 1914. She played no part in the First World War, being relegated to a corner of the Cherbourg dockyard for the duration. X was listed for sale in 1920 and was sold for scrap two years later.

== See also ==
- List of submarines of France

== Bibliography ==
- Smigielski, Adam (1985). "France". In Gray, Randal (ed.). Conway's All the World's Fighting Ships 1906–1921. Naval Institute Press. pp. 190–220. ISBN 0-87021-907-3.
- Garier, Gérard (1995). L'odyssée technique et humaine du sous-marin en France [The Technical and Human Odyssey of the Submarine in France: From Plongeur (1863) to Guêpe (1904)] (in French). Vol. 1: Du Plongeur (1863) aux Guêpe (1904). Marines édition. ISBN 2-909675-19-X.
- Roberts, Stephen S. (2021). French Warships in the Age of Steam 1859–1914: Design, Construction, Careers and Fates. Seaforth Publishing. ISBN 978-1-5267-4533-0.
