= French submarine Henri Fournier =

Henri Fournier
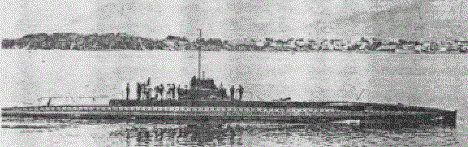
- Henri Fournier circa 1921

History

Romania
- Builder: Forges et Chantiers de la Gironde, France
- Laid down: April 1917
- Fate: Requisitioned by the French Navy, December 1917

France
- Name: Henri Fournier
- Namesake: Henri Fournier
- Launched: 31 September 1919
- Completed: 1921
- Commissioned: 1921
- Fate: Stricken and sold for scrap in 1935

General characteristics
- Displacement: 342 tons (surfaced)
- Length: 52.4 m (171 ft 11 in)
- Beam: 4.7 m (15 ft 5 in)
- Draft: 2.7 m (8 ft 10 in)
- Propulsion: 2 Schneider diesel engines, 2 electric motors, 2 shafts
- Speed: 14 knots (26 km/h; 16 mph) (surfaced)
- Range: 1,850 nmi (3,430 km; 2,130 mi) (10 knots (19 km/h; 12 mph))
- Complement: 25
- Armament: 1 × 47 mm (1.9 in) Hotchkiss deck gun; 4 × 450 mm (17.7 in) torpedo tubes

The French submarine Henri Fournier was the second of three submarines built for the French Navy from 1917 to 1920. It were originally ordered by the Romanian Navy, but was confiscated by the French government during World War I while still under construction. It was built at the Schneider shipyard in Chalon-sur-Saône. Henri Fournier was commissioned in the French Navy, serving in the Mediterranean Sea. The ship was stricken from the Navy list and sold for scrap in 1935.

== Construction and specifications ==
Henri Fournier was ordered by the Romanian Government from the Schneider Shipyard in Lormont, being laid down in April 1917. However, Romania was forced out of the war in December 1917, when the construction of the warship was at an early stage. The submarine was subsequently completed for the French Navy, with larger bridges and conning towers. Henri Fournier was completed and commissioned in 1921. It had a surfaced displacement of 342 tons, measuring 52.4 meters in length, with a beam of 4.7 meters and a draught of 2.7 meters. Power plant consisted of two Schneider diesel engines and two electric motors powering two shafts, resulting in a surfaced top speed of 14 knots. It had a range of 1,850 nautical miles at 10 knots and a crew of 25. Armament consisted of four 450 mm torpedo tubes and one 47 mm deck gun.

== Service ==
The three boats incorporated lessons from the French war experience, and thus proved to be reasonably successful. They served in the Mediterranean after World War I, but their careers were uneventful, and they were taken out of service before the start of World War II. Louis Dupetit-Thouars was stricken in November 1928 and her two sisters in August 1935.

Had Henri Fournier been delivered to Romania upon completion, she would have become the second Romanian submarine (after her sister ships O'Byrne). This role would be fulfilled by the Italian-built Delfinul in 1936.

== See also ==
- List of submarines of France
