= Du Petit =

Du Petit is a surname. Notable people with the surname include:

- François Pourfour du Petit (1664–1741), French anatomist, ophthalmologist, and surgeon
- Du Petit-Thouars, several people
