= Du Petit-Thouars =

Du Petit-Thouars may refer to:

- Louis-Marie Aubert du Petit-Thouars (1758–1831), French botanist, brother of Aristide
- Aristide Aubert du Petit-Thouars (1760–1798), French Navy officer and hero of the Battle of the Nile, brother of Louis-Marie
- Abel Aubert du Petit-Thouars (1793–1864), a French Navy admiral who took possession of Tahiti for France
- Abel-Nicolas Bergasse du Petit-Thouars (1832–1890), French Navy admiral who participated to the Boshin War in Japan

== See also ==
- Du Petit
- Thouars (disambiguation)
- French ship Dupetit-Thouars, the name of several ships
