= French submarine Atalante (Q162) =

Argonaute-class submarine, French Navy, 1934

History

France
- Name: Atalante
- Namesake: Atalanta, a heroine in Greek mythology
- Builder: Chantiers Schneider et Cie, Chalon-sur-Saône, France
- Laid down: 17 August 1928
- Launched: 5 August 1930
- Commissioned: 18 September 1934
- Decommissioned: 1944
- Stricken: 23 March 1946
- Fate: Condemned 25 March 1946

General characteristics
- Type: Submarine
- Displacement: 630 tonnes (620 long tons) surfaced; 798 tonnes (785 long tons) submerged
- Length: 63.4 m (208 ft)
- Beam: 6.4 m (21 ft)
- Draught: 4.24 m (13.9 ft)
- Propulsion: 2 × Schneider-Carel diesel engines, 1,300 bhp (969 kW); 2 × electric motors, 1,000 shp (746 kW); 2 shafts
- Speed: 14 knots (26 km/h; 16 mph) surfaced; 9 knots (17 km/h; 10 mph) submerged
- Range: 4,000 nmi (7,400 km) at 10 knots (19 km/h; 12 mph) surfaced; 82 nmi (152 km) at 5 knots (9.3 km/h; 5.8 mph) submerged
- Test depth: 80 m (260 ft)
- Complement: 41
- Armament: 6 × 550 mm (22 in) torpedo tubes; 2 × 400 mm (16 in) torpedo tubes; 1 × 75 mm (3 in) deck gun; 1 × 8 mm (0.31 in) machine gun

Atalante (Q162) was an Argonaute-class submarine in commission in the French Navy from 1934 to 1944. She saw service in World War II, first on the side of the Allies from September 1939 to June 1940, then in the forces of Vichy France until November 1942, when she became part of the Free French Naval Forces.

== Construction and commissioning ==
Atalante was ordered as part of the 1927 program. Laid down by Chantiers Schneider et Cie at Chalon-sur-Saône, France, on 17 August 1928 with the pennant number Q162, she was launched on 5 August 1930. She was commissioned on 18 September 1934.

== Service history ==
=== French Navy ===
When World War II began with Nazi Germany′s invasion of Poland on 1 September 1939, Atalante was stationed at Bizerte in Tunisia as part of the 17th Submarine Division in the 6th Squadron, a component of the 4th Flotilla in Maritime Prefecture IV. Also in the division were her sister ships Aréthuse, La Sultane, and La Vestale. France entered the war on 3 September 1939.

The Battle of France began when German ground forces advanced into France, the Netherlands, Belgium, and Luxembourg on 10 May 1940, and Italy declared war on France on 10 June 1940 and joined the invasion. Atalante was among nine submarines scheduled to depart Toulon, France, on 18 June 1940 bound for French North Africa, but the departure never took place and all nine submarines remained at Toulon.

The Battle of France ended in France's defeat and armistice with Germany and Italy, which went into effect on 25 June 1940. On that day, Atalante was at Toulon.

=== Vichy France ===
After the June 1940 armistice, Atalante served in the naval forces of Vichy France. She was placed under guard in an unarmed and unfueled status in accordance with the terms of the armistice in June 1940 and remained in that status until December 1940.

After Atalante was reactivated, she proceeded to French North Africa. She called at Casablanca in French Morocco from 20 to 27 January 1941, when she got back underway bound for French West Africa. She arrived at Dakar in Senegal on 1 February 1941 and became part of the 17th Submarine Division there.

While operating from Dakar, Atalante and La Vestale both sustained diesel engine damage that could not be repaired in French West Africa. The two submarines departed Dakar on 22 August 1941 bound for southern French Morocco, where Atalante called at Agadir from 23 to 29 August 1941 before rendezvousing with La Vestale at Safi on 30 August. The two submarines arrived at Casablanca on 31 August 1941.

As part of the 17th Submarine Division, Atalante subsequently conducted patrols in the Atlantic Ocean. On 4 March 1942, the four submarines of the 17th Submarine Division departed Casablanca bound for Toulon where they were to undergo streamlining. With the work completed on all four of its submarines, the 17th Submarine Division departed Toulon on 30 September 1942 to return to Casablanca.

Atalante is recorded as having been at sea in the Atlantic on 1 November 1942 during a voyage from Casablanca to Dakar in company with Aréthuse, La Sultane, and La Vestale.

On 8 November 1942, Allied forces landed in French North Africa in Operation Torch. Fighting between Allied and Vichy French forces ended on 11 November 1942.

=== Free France ===
After the cessation of hostilities between Allied and French forces in French North Africa, French forces in Africa, including Atalante, joined the forces of Free France. By mid-November 1942, Atalante was part of the Free French Naval Forces and was at the submarine base at Oran in Algeria with the submarine Orphée. She subsequently supported activities at the sound schools in French Morocco, at Dakar, and at Freetown in Sierra Leone. By November 1943, Atalante and the submarines Amphitrite, Le Glorieux, and Marsouin made up the Moroccan Submarine Group at Casablanca.

Atalante was decommissioned at Oran in May 1944. By August 1945, she was at La Pallice, France. She was stricken from the navy list on 23 March 1946 and condemned on 26 March 1946.

== See also ==
- List of submarines of France
- French submarines of World War II
