= NMS Rechinul =

WW2 Romanian Navy submarine

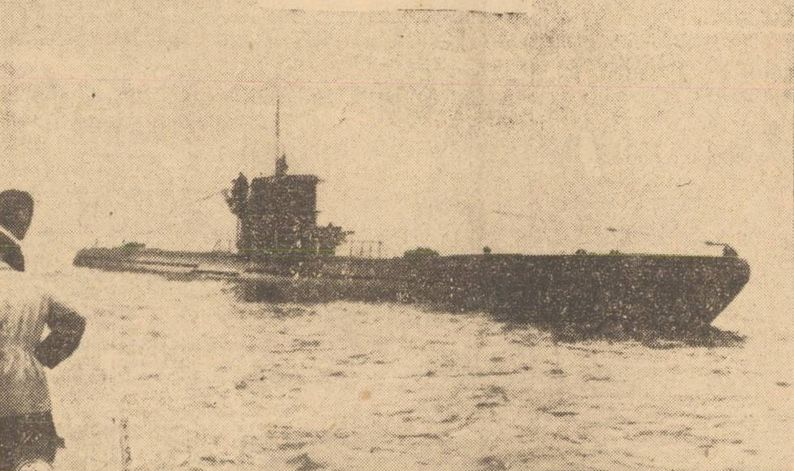
- Rechinul returning from a mission in 1943

History

Romania
- Name: Rechinul
- Builder: Galați shipyard, Romania
- Laid down: 1938
- Launched: 1941
- Completed: 1942
- Out of service: 1944
- Reinstated: 1951
- Fate: Scrapped 1967

Soviet Union
- Name: TS-1
- Commissioned: 1944
- Out of service: 1951
- Fate: Returned to Romania

General characteristics (most of the data from:)
- Displacement: 585 tons surfaced; 789 tons submerged
- Length: 66 m (216 ft 6 in)
- Beam: 5.9 m (19 ft 4 in)
- Draft: 3.6 m (11 ft 10 in)
- Propulsion: 2 MAN diesel engines, 2 electric motors, 2 shafts (1840 bhp)
- Speed: 17 knots (31 km/h; 20 mph) surfaced; 9 knots (17 km/h; 10 mph) submerged
- Range: 7,000 nmi (13,000 km; 8,100 mi)
- Complement: 45
- Armament: 1 x 20 mm Oerlikon autocannon; 4 × 533 mm torpedo tubes; 40 x mines

NMS Rechinul (the shark) was a submarine of the Romanian Navy, one of the few warships built in Romania during World War II and used during the war. She was made at the Galați shipyard in 1938, launched in 1941, and completed in 1942. Rechinul took part in the evacuation of the Crimea and later performed the longest mission in Romanian submarine history, starting on 15 June 1944 and lasting 45 days.

== Sister ship ==
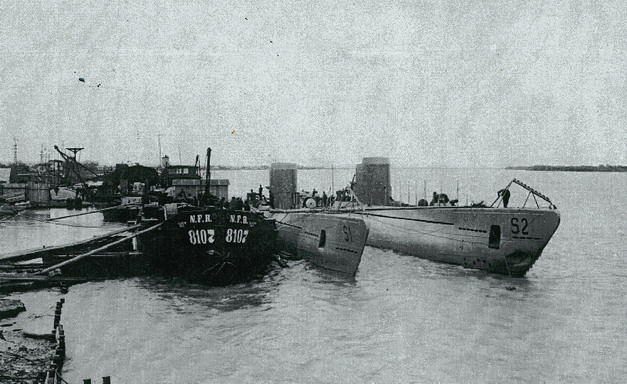
Rechinul (left) and her half-sister Marsuinul (right)

Rechinul was very similar to NMS Marsuinul (the porpoise). The two submarines had a lot in common, and were built around the same period.

== Career ==
Rechinul was a minelaying submarine, designed by Ingenieurskantoor voor Scheepsbouw (IvS), and built at the Galați shipyard in Romania. She was laid down in 1938 and launched on 22 May 1941. She had the same power plant as her sister ship, with a slightly faster surface top speed of 17 knots, due to her standard (surfaced) displacement of 585 tons (35 tons lighter than her sister). Her submerged top speed was however the same, 9 knots. She was armed with four 533 mm torpedo tubes, one 20 mm anti-aircraft gun, and could carry up to 40 mines.

Rechinul's career was more eventful than her sister's, as she carried out two patrol missions. Her first mission took place during the 1944 evacuation of the Crimea, between 20 April and 15 May. Initially, she was only tasked with patrolling the Turkish coast, but on 30 April, she was tasked with the surveillance of the Soviet port of Batumi. The information on Soviet naval movements she transmitted during her mission proved to be very useful to the German and Romanian ships which were carrying out the evacuation of Sevastopol. Her second and last mission consisted in a patrol off the Soviet port of Novorossyisk, between 15 June and 27 July. She was heavily pursued and hunted by Soviet forces, but just like her sister, she managed to return to Constanța without any losses. This was the last Romanian submarine patrol of the war, and with a length of over 40 days, the longest in Romanian submarine history.

== Fate ==
Rechinul was, just like Marsuinul, captured by Soviet forces after the 23 August 1944 coup, and commissioned as TS-1 on 20 October 1944. She was returned to Romania in 1951. She was withdrawn from active service by 1961 and finally scrapped in 1967.

== Comparison with other minelaying submarines ==
Type	Displacement (surfaced)	Mines carried	Torpedo tubes	Deck guns
Rechinul	585 tons	40	4 x 533 mm	1 x 20 mm
Leninets-class	1,051 tons	20	8 x 533 mm	1 x 100 mm 1 x 45 mm
Type X	1,763 tons	66	2 x 533 mm	1 x 105 mm

== See also ==
- Romanian submarine Delfinul
- NMS Delfinul
