= Joessel-class submarine =

WWI French naval vessel

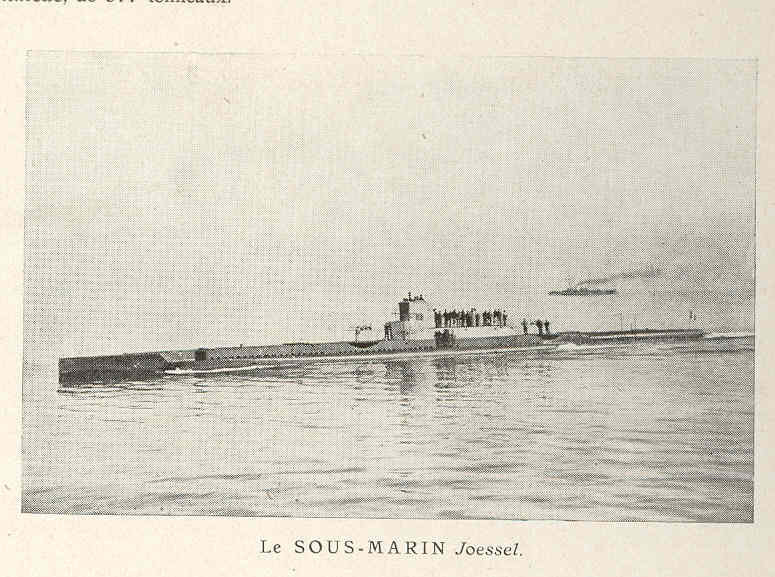
- Joessel in 1913

Class overview
- Name: Joessel class
- Operators: French Navy
- Preceded by: Armide class
- Succeeded by: Lagrange class
- Built: 1913 – 1920
- Planned: 8
- Completed: 2
- Canceled: 6
- Retired: 2

General characteristics
- Type: Submarine
- Displacement: 870 long tons (880 t) (surfaced); 1,247 long tons (1,267 t) (submerged)
- Length: 74 m (242 ft 9 in)
- Beam: 6.4 m (21 ft 0 in)
- Draught: 3.62 m (11 ft 11 in)
- Propulsion: 2 × diesel engines, 2,700 hp (2,013 kW); 2 × electric motors, 1,640 hp (1,223 kW)
- Speed: 16.5 knots (30.6 km/h) (surfaced); 11 knots (20 km/h) (submerged)
- Range: 4,300 nmi (8,000 km) at 10 knots (19 km/h); 125 nmi (232 km) at 5 knots (9.3 km/h) (submerged)
- Complement: 47
- Armament: 8 × 450 mm (17.7 in) torpedo tubes; 2 × 75 mm (3.0 in) deck guns

The Joessel-class submarines were a class of two diesel-electric submarines built for the French Navy laid down before the start of World War I and completed after. They were built in the Arsenal de Cherbourg from 1913 to 1920, before entering service with the French Navy in 1920 and serving until 1936.

== Design ==
The Joessel class was ordered as part of the French fleet's 1914 program. The ships were designed by Jean Simonot, as a modification of his previous project, Gustave Zédé, using two Parsons steam turbines with a power of 2,000 horsepower (1,500 kW). During construction, though, the idea was abandoned and the ships were instead equipped with diesel engines.

The submarines had a surfaced displacement of 870 long tons (884 t) and a submerged displacement of 1,247 long tons (1,267 t). The dimensions were 74 metres (242 ft 9 in) long, with a beam of 6.4 m (21 ft 0 in) and a draught of 3.62 m (11 ft 11 in). They had two propeller shafts powered by two diesel engines built by Schneider-Carels for surface running with a combined total of 2,700 horsepower (2,000 kW) and two electric motors which together produced 1,640 hp (1,220 kW) for submerged propulsion. Their maximum speed was 16.5 knots (30.6 km/h; 19.0 mph) on the surface and 11 knots (20 km/h; 13 mph) while submerged with a surfaced range of 4,300 nautical miles (8,000 km; 4,900 mi) at 10 knots (19 km/h; 12 mph) and a submerged range of 125 nautical miles (232 km; 144 mi) at 5 knots (9.3 km/h; 5.8 mph). Their complement was 47 men. (Note: Couhat gives two 450 bhp (340 kW) diesels and two 850 shp (630 kW) electric motors)

The ships were armed with eight 450 mm torpedo tubes (four in the bow, two stern, and two external trainable mounts), with a total of ten torpedoes and two 75 mm (3.0 in) guns.

== Ships ==
Two Joessel-class submarines were built in the Arsenal de Cherbourg, France. The ships were laid down in November 1913, launched between 1917 and 1919, and completed in 1920. Joessel received the pennant number Q 109, and Fulton, Q 110. It was planned to build six additional vessels of this type, numbered Q 115 to Q 120, but the order was canceled in the course of World War I.

Joessel-class submarines
Name	Laid down	Launched	Completed	Fate
Joessel	November 1913	21 July 1917	February 1920	Stricken in May 1936.
Fulton	November 1913	1 April 1919	July 1920	Stricken in May 1936.

== Service ==
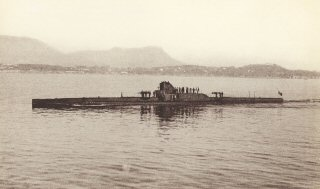
Joessel

After completion, the ships were refitted: they received a new higher cylindrical conning tower, bridge and two periscopes of 7.5 m (24 ft 7 in) (at the conning tower) and 9.5 m (31 ft 2 in) (in the central operations room).

The ships served in the Atlantic until the early 1930s and were transferred to French Indochina. They were stricken in May 1936.
