= French submarine Fulton =

Submarine

Fulton
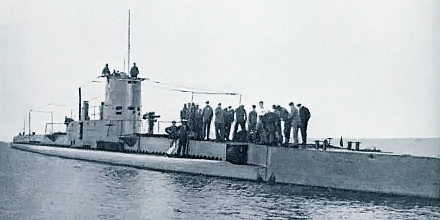
- Fulton, 1930

History

France
- Name: Fulton
- Namesake: Robert Fulton
- Builder: Arsenal de Cherbourg
- Laid down: November 1913
- Launched: 1 April 1919
- Completed: July 1920
- Out of service: May 1936
- Fate: Stricken in May 1936

General characteristics
- Type: Submarine
- Displacement: 870 long tons (884 t) (surfaced); 1,247 long tons (1,267 t) (submerged)
- Length: 74 m (242 ft 9 in)
- Beam: 6.4 m (21 ft 0 in)
- Draught: 3.62 m (11 ft 11 in)
- Propulsion: 2 × diesel engines, 2,700 hp (2,013 kW); 2 × electric motors, 1,640 hp (1,223 kW)
- Speed: 16.5 knots (30.6 km/h) (surfaced); 11 knots (20 km/h) (submerged)
- Range: 4,300 nautical miles (8,000 km) at 10 knots (19 km/h); 125 nautical miles (232 km) at 5 knots (9.3 km/h) (submerged)
- Complement: 47
- Armament: 8 × 450 mm (17.7 in) torpedo tubes; 2 × 75 mm (3.0 in) deck guns

The French submarine Fulton was a Joessel-class diesel-electric attack submarine built for the French Navy between 1913 and 1919. Fulton was built in the Arsenal de Cherbourg from 1913 to 1920, entered the French Marine Nationale in July 1920 and served until May 1936.

== Design ==
Fulton was ordered in the French fleet's 1914 program as part of the two ship Joessel class. The ships were designed by Jean Simonot, as a modification of his previous project, Gustave Zédé, using two Parsons steam turbines with a power of 2,000 hp (1,491 kW). During construction, though, the idea was abandoned and the ships were instead equipped with diesel engines.

The submarine had a surfaced displacement of 870 long tons (884 t) and a submerged displacement of 1,247 long tons (1,267 tonnes). The dimensions were 74 metres (242 feet 9 inches) long, with a beam of 6.4 m (21 ft 0 in) and a draught of 3.62 m (11 ft 11 in). She had two shafts powered by two diesel engines built by Schneider-Carels for surface running with a combined total of 2,700 hp (2,013 kW) and two electric motors which together produced 1,640 horsepower (1,220 kilowatts) for submerged propulsion. Her maximum speed was 16.5 knots (30.6 kilometres per hour; 19.0 miles per hour) on the surface and 11 knots (20 km/h; 13 mph) while submerged with a surfaced range of 4,300 nautical miles (8,000 kilometres; 4,900 miles) at 10 knots (19 km/h) and a submerged range of 125 nautical miles (232 km) at 5 knots (9.3 km/h). The boat's complement was 47 men. (Note: Couhat gives 2 × 450 BHP diesels and 2 × 850 SHP electric motors)

Fulton was armed with eight 450 mm torpedo tubes (four in the bow, two stern and two external trainable mounts), with a total of 10 torpedoes and two 75 mm (3.0 in) guns.

== Service ==
Fulton was built in the Arsenal de Cherbourg. She was laid down in November 1913, launched on 1 April 1919, and was completed in July 1920. Fulton was named after Robert Fulton, the American inventor of the first commercially successful steamboat and first practical submarine, Nautilus, and received the pennant number Q 110.

She was refitted during the 1920s when she received a new conning tower, bridge and two periscopes of 7.5 m (at the conning tower) and 9.5 m (at Headquarters).

Fulton served in the Atlantic until the early 1930s when she was transferred to Indochina. She was stricken in May 1936.
