= French submarine Doris (P84) =

British and French Submarine

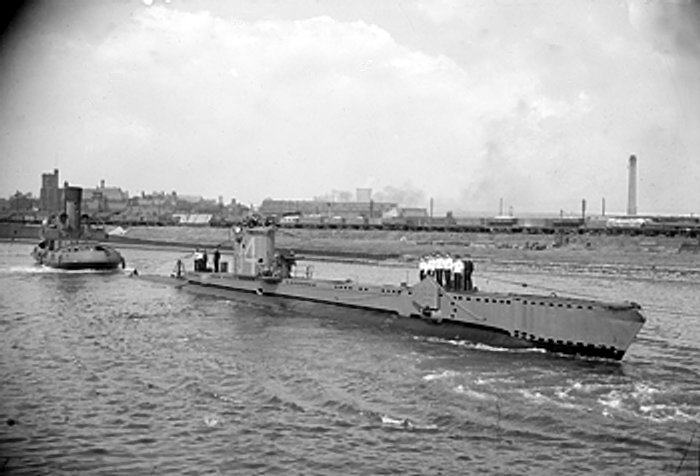
- Doris (ex-HMS Vineyard) on 31 July 1944.

History

United Kingdom
- Name: HMS Vineyard
- Namesake: Vineyard, a plantation of grape-bearing vines
- Operator: Royal Navy
- Ordered: 21 May 1942
- Builder: Vickers-Armstrongs, Barrow-in-Furness, England
- Laid down: 21 May 1943
- Launched: 8 May 1944
- Commissioned: Never
- Fate: Transferred to Free French Naval Forces 30 June 1944 or 1 August 1944 (see text); Returned by French Navy 18 November 1947; Scrapped June 1950

France
- Name: Doris
- Namesake: Doris, a sea goddess in Greek mythology
- Operator: Free French Naval Forces
- Acquired: 30 June 1944 or 1 August 1944 (see text)
- Commissioned: 1 August 1944
- Fate: Returned to Royal Navy 18 November 1947

General characteristics
- Class & type: V-class submarine
- Displacement: 545 long tons (554 t) surfaced; 740 long tons (752 t) submerged
- Length: 62.33 m (204 ft 6 in)
- Beam: 4.9 m (16 ft 1 in)
- Draught: 4.65 m (15 ft 3 in)
- Propulsion: 2 x Paxman diesel engines, 615 bhp (459 kW); 55–56 tonnes (54–55 long tons; 61–62 short tons) diesel fuel; 2 x electric motors 825 shp (615 kW)
- Speed: 11.25 knots (20.8 km/h; 12.9 mph) surfaced; 8.5 or 10 knots (15.7 or 18.5 km/h; 9.8 or 11.5 mph) submerged (sources disagree)
- Test depth: 91.4 m (300 ft)
- Complement: 42
- Armament: 4 × 533 mm (21 in) bow torpedo tubes; 8 torpedoes or 6 mines; 1 × 76 mm (3 in) deck gun; 3 × 7.7 mm (.303-calibre) machine guns

Doris (P84) was a British-built V-class submarine loaned to the Free French Naval Forces in 1944 during World War II. She was returned to the Royal Navy in 1947 and scrapped in 1950.

== Construction and commissioning ==
The British Royal Navy ordered Doris on 21 May 1942, with the name HMS Vineyard and the pennant number P84. Vineyard′s keel was laid down in the United Kingdom at Barrow-in-Furness in Cumbria, England, a year later on 21 May 1943 by Vickers-Armstrongs. She was launched on 8 May 1944.

The Royal Navy decided to loan Vineyard to the Free French Naval Forces, who initially planned to rename her Laubeuf, then considered Joule before settling on the name Doris. The Free French submarine Minerve had been badly damaged in a friendly fire attack by a Royal Air Force patrol plane in October 1943, and after the Free French decided not to repair her, they gave her crew the option of transferring to Doris, transferring to the submarine Curie, or leaving the French submarine force entirely to serve aboard a Free French surface warship. Minerve′s officers and crew chose to man Doris, and they reported aboard her on 5 June 1944.

On either 30 June or 1 August 1944, according to different sources, the Royal Navy transferred the submarine to the Free French Naval Forces. The second French Navy submarine to bear the name Doris, she was commissioned into service in the Free French Naval Forces on 1 August 1944, retaining the British pennant number P84 in French service.

== Service history ==
After training and testing on the River Clyde in Scotland, Doris departed the United Kingdom for Oran in French Algeria on 4 October 1944. By February 1945 she was based at Toulon, France, where she supported training activities at the sound school. Her commanding officer in the spring of 1945 was the French Resistance figure Jacques Le Gall. Doris returned to Oran later in 1945.

By 1946 Doris was at La Pallice, France. The French Navy returned her to the Royal Navy on 18 November 1947. She made stopovers at the submarine bases at Lorient and Brest, France, before her arrival in the United Kingdom.

In June 1950 Doris was scrapped in the United States at Charlestown in Boston, Massachusetts.
