= French submarine Curie (P67) =

French submarine in the Second World War

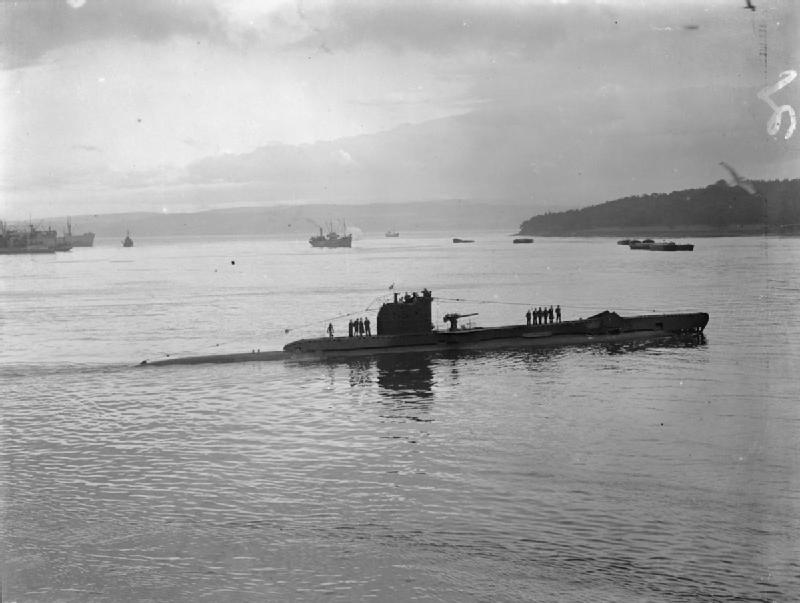
- Curie starts out from Holy Loch on her first big patrol, 20 August 1943.

History
- Name: Vox / Curie
- Builder: Vickers Armstrong, Barrow-in-Furness
- Laid down: 29 April 1942
- Launched: 23 January 1943
- Commissioned: 2 May 1943
- Out of service: 2 May 1943 transferred to FNFL
- Reinstated: July 1946 returned to Royal Navy
- Fate: Scrapped, May 1949 at Milford Haven
- Badge

General characteristics
- Displacement: Surfaced - 540 tons standard, 630 tons full load; Submerged - 740 tons
- Length: 196 ft 9 in (59.97 m)
- Beam: 16 ft 1 in (4.90 m)
- Draught: 15 ft 2 in (4.62 m)
- Propulsion: 2 shaft diesel-electric; 2 Paxman-Ricardo diesel generators + electric motors; 615 / 825 hp
- Speed: 11.25 knots (20.84 km/h; 12.95 mph) max surfaced; 9 knots (17 km/h; 10 mph) max submerged
- Complement: 4 officers, 33 men (in French service)
- Armament: 4 bow internal, 2 bow external 21 inch (533 mm) torpedo tubes: 8 - 10 torpedoes; 1 × 3 in (76 mm) gun; 3 × AA machine guns

The French submarine Curie was a British-built U-class submarine, a member of the third group of that class to be built. Laid down as HMS Vox for the Royal Navy she was transferred to the Free French Naval Forces on the day she was commissioned, where she served as Curie from 1943 to 1946, but retaining her pennant number of P67. When P67 returned to the Royal Navy in July 1946 she re-assumed the name Vox.

== Service ==
Curie was handed over to the Free French Naval Forces on 2 May 1943, at a ceremony at Vickers' works in Barrow, north west England. General de Gaulle was present at the occasion, when RN sailors and Vickers workers saluted the raising of the Cross of Lorraine. She was named after the earlier French submarine Curie, which saw action in World War I.

After a working up period (during which her screws were damaged on 21 May 1943), her first patrol was to the Norwegian coast in June–July 1943. Up to 3 August 1943, when Free French Naval Forces amalgamated with those from French North Africa, she had been on patrol for 60 days and spent 192 hours submerged.

On the night of 21 June 1944 she bombarded construction sites for shore batteries at Cap Gros on the Mediterranean coast, and observed several hits. Several weeks later she was working with a British flotilla in the Dodecanese, sinking a cargo ship on 3 August. On 2 October in the same area she sank the merchant ships Zar Ferdinand and Brunhild (the former French wine-tanker Bacchus).

In 1945 Curie relocated from Plymouth to Brest in France, subsequently moving for a refit to Lorient where she stayed until March 1946. She was then on detached duty to a detection school at Casablanca and returned to the Royal Navy in July 1946 where she regained the name HMS Vox.

== Insignia ==
The badge of HMS Vox is a horn or cornucopia surmounted by a trident. That of Curie was of similar pattern as Royal Navy badges. The badge shows a stag's head and the inscription "Pola 1914", recalling the World War I exploit when the first Curie was lost. The ship's mascot was a terrier named Radium.

== See also ==
- List of submarines of France
