= French submarine O'Byrne =

O'Byrne
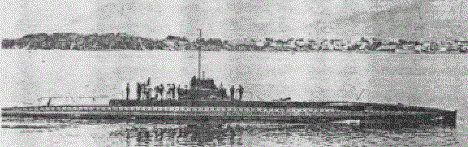
- Sister ship Henri Fournier in 1921

History

Romania
- Builder: Forges et Chantiers de la Gironde, France
- Laid down: April 1917
- Fate: Requisitioned by the French Navy, December 1917

France
- Name: O'Byrne
- Namesake: Gabriel O'Byrne
- Launched: May 1919
- Completed: 1921
- Commissioned: 1921
- Fate: Stricken, August 1935

General characteristics
- Displacement: 342 tons (surfaced)
- Length: 52.4 m (171 ft 11 in)
- Beam: 4.7 m (15 ft 5 in)
- Draft: 2.7 m (8 ft 10 in)
- Propulsion: 2 Schneider diesel engines, 2 electric motors, 2 shafts
- Speed: 14 knots (26 km/h; 16 mph) (surfaced)
- Range: 1,850 nmi (3,430 km; 2,130 mi) (10 knots (19 km/h; 12 mph))
- Complement: 25
- Armament: 1 × 47 mm (1.9 in) Hotchkiss deck gun; 4 × 450 mm (17.7 in) torpedo tubes

O'Byrne was a submarine of the French Navy, the lead ship of her class. She was ordered by Romania during World War I and laid down in April 1917 at the Schneider Shipyard in Gironde. However, she was requisitioned by French authorities at the end of the year and completed for the French Naval Forces. Upon commissioning in 1921, she became the first French submarine to be completed between 1919 and 1944.

== Construction and specifications ==
O'Byrne and her two sister ships (Henri Fournier and Louis Dupetit-Thouars) were ordered by the Romanian Government from the Schneider Shipyard in Gironde, being laid down in April 1917. However, Romania was forced out of the war in December 1917, when the construction of the three warships was at an early stage. The three submarines were subsequently completed for the French Navy, with larger bridges and conning towers. O'Byrne was the first to be launched (22 May 1919), followed by Henri Fournier (30 September 1919) and Louis Dupetit-Thouars (12 May 1920). They were completed and commissioned in 1921. Each of the three submarines had a surfaced displacement of 342 tons, measuring 52.4 meters in length, with a beam of 4.7 meters and a draught of 2.7 meters. Power plant consisted of two Schneider diesel engines and two electric motors powering two shafts, resulting in a surfaced top speed of 14 knots. Each vessel had a range of 1,850 nautical miles at 10 knots and a crew of 25. Armament consisted of four 450 mm torpedo tubes and one 47 mm deck gun.

== Service ==
The three boats incorporated lessons from the French war experience, and thus proved to be reasonably successful. They served in the Mediterranean after World War I, but their careers were uneventful, and they were taken out of service before the start of World War II. Louis Dupetit-Thouars was stricken in November 1928 and her two sisters in August 1935.

Had O'Byrne been delivered to Romania upon completion, she would have become the first Romanian submarine. This role would be fulfilled by the Italian-built Delfinul in 1936.
