= NMS Delfinul =

Romanian submarine

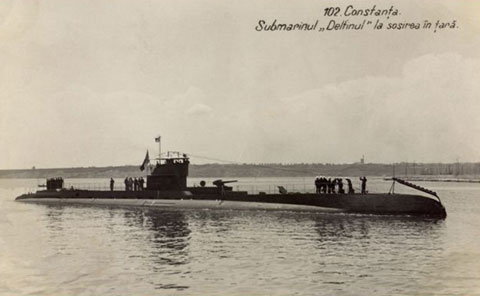
- NMS Delfinul in June 1936

History

Romania
- Name: NMS Delfinul
- Namesake: dolphin
- Builder: Italian naval base and shipyard, Fiume
- Laid down: 1927
- Launched: 1930
- Completed: 1931
- Commissioned: 1936
- Out of service: 1944
- Refit: Galați shipyard, starting late 1942
- Reinstated: 1951
- Fate: Stricken 1957

Soviet Union
- Name: TS-3
- Commissioned: 1944
- Decommissioned: 1945
- Fate: Returned to Romania in 1951

General characteristics
- Displacement: Surfaced: 650 long tons; Submerged: 900 long tons
- Length: 68 m (223 ft)
- Beam: 5.9 m (19 ft)
- Draught: 3.6 m (12 ft)
- Propulsion: 2 Sulzer diesel engines, 2 electric motors, 2 shafts
- Speed: Surfaced: 14 knots (26 km/h; 16 mph); Submerged: 9 knots (17 km/h; 10 mph)
- Range: 2,000 nautical miles (3,704 km; 2,302 mi)
- Complement: 55
- Armament: 1 × 102 mm Bofors naval gun; 1 x 13 mm twin machine gun; 8 x 533 mm torpedo tubes (4 bow and 4 stern)

NMS Delfinul (The Dolphin) was a Romanian submarine that served in the Black Sea during the Second World War. It was the first submarine of the Romanian Navy, built in Italy under Romanian supervision.

== Construction and specifications ==
Delfinul was ordered in 1927 from the Italian naval base and shipyard at Fiume (today Rijeka, Croatia). It was completed in 1931, but was accepted by Romania as the country's first submarine only in 1936, after the many corrections required by the Romanians were completed. She had a surfaced displacement of 650 tons, which grew to 900 tons when submerged. The boat measured 68 metres (223 ft) in length, with a beam of 5.9 metres (19 ft) and a draught of 3.6 metres (12 ft). Her power plant consisted of two Sulzer diesel engines and two electric motors powering two shafts, giving her a top speed of 14 knots (26 km/h; 16 mph) on the surface and 9 knots (17 km/h; 10 mph) submerged. Her crew amounted to 55. She was armed with eight 533 mm (21 in) torpedo tubes (4 bow and 4 stern), one 102 mm (4 in) deck gun and one twin 13 mm (0.51 in) machine gun. One more boat of this class was planned, but not laid down.

== Role in World War II ==
Delfinul played an essential role in the Black Sea war against the Soviet Union in World War II. Its home base was the Constanța Naval Base, from where the submarine completed nine wartime patrols. When Romania entered the war (22 June 1941), the navy had only one submarine, but that presence meant that the Soviet Black Sea Fleet had to secure an anti-submarine service for its convoys and near its naval bases. As a fleet in being, Delfinul had only to exist rather than taking part in the battles. It was kept under shelter in Constanța and rarely got out to do a reconnaissance mission. That changed when two modern submarines were built at the Galați shipyard in Eastern Romania – NMS Rechinul ("Shark") and NMS Marsuinul ("Porpoise").

=== Patrol 1 ===
Căpitan (USN rank – lieutenant) Constantin Costăchescu commanded Delfinul on its first war patrol from 22 – 27 June 1941.. A simple reconnaissance mission 60 nautical miles (111 km; 69 mi) from shore. On 26 June at 00:30, Costăchescu reported back to Constanța that a large Soviet war group was approaching Constanța. Because they lost their element of surprise, the Soviets lost a destroyer (Moskva) and the lead ship Kharkov and the cruiser Voroshilov were damaged in the following battle.

=== Patrol 2 ===
The next patrol took place from 10 to 20 July, under the command of Căpitan (USN rank – Lieutenant) Corneliu Lungu. Delfinul patrolled the south of the Crimean peninsula and made a reconnaissance mission to Novorossiysk, trying to evaluate the anti-aircraft and anti-submarine capabilities of the enemy naval base. On 13 July, it was southwest of Cape Idokopas, and on 15 July, it reached the south of Feodosiya. In that area, they spotted an enemy ship, but it vanished shortly after. During the night, it was detected by an enemy patrol craft, but Delfinul quickly submerged and avoided being attacked. On 16 July, the gyrocompass broke down and the submarine began its journey home. 95 nautical miles (176 km; 109 mi) from Cape Sabla, Delfinul spotted a small Russian submarine on the surface, probably from the Malyutka class. Delfinul tried to attack it with the deck gun, but the rough seas and two unidentified hydroplanes led the commanding officer to decide to dive the submarine and break contact.

On 30 July, Delfinul was scheduled to start another patrol at 16:00 (4:00 pm), but an engine malfunction forced the submarine to return to port at 19:00 (7:00 pm).

=== Patrol 3 ===
On the third patrol (12–20 August 1941,) Delfinul returned under the command of Căpitan Costăchescu. Its mission was to attack the convoys leaving or arriving at Odesa. They only had two poor chances to attack anything, on the nights of 13–14 and 19 August, but they could not maintain contact. The sector was abundant in enemy patrol craft and hydroplanes. The submarine also made a reconnaissance mission on the coast of Crimea.

On 20 August, on the way home (four miles off Constanța), she fought the only submarine vs submarine engagement of the Black Sea naval war. At 12:08 pm, the Soviet M-class submarine M-33 launched a torpedo at her, which missed. Delfinul swiftly counterattacked with her twin 13mm machine gun, causing the Soviet submarine to submerge and retreat.

=== Patrol 4 ===
The 4th patrol (3–19 September) took Delfinul deeper in enemy-controlled waters. This time, the chance to attack surface vessels really presented itself. After spotting two convoys which Delfinul couldn't follow, on 9 September, at 9:35, it was detected on the surface by a cruiser, which Căpitan (USN rank – Lieutenant) Corneliu Lungu identified as the Soviet cruiser Komintern. The submarine carefully manoeuvred because of the underwater rocks. In the following days, the submarine had some chances of attack but the rough seas made it impossible. On 10 September, the submarine got into firing range of a two-ship convoy 20 nautical miles (37 km; 23 mi) west of Cape Otrishenok, but the charge of an escort vessel forced Căpitan Lungu to submerge and lose contact. Another chance presented itself on 16 September at 5:05 west of Novorosiisk, in the form of a Russian tanker and its escort. But the escort spotted the periscope. When they raised the periscope again, the CO saw that the escort called for help so he submerged and left the area, following the directive to take no chances with the escorts. On 17 September, it took a course for Constanța, and, on the way back, it was spotted by several Russian hydroplanes and even depth charged by a patrol craft.

=== Patrol 5 ===
The fifth patrol took place between 2 and 7 November 1941, and it is the patrol when the only attack of Delfinul took place. Its mission was to attack the convoys destined for Sevastopol. Its CO was Constantin Costăchescu. Near Constanța they spotted an enemy submarine, but because of the darkness, they lost it. On the morning of 5 November, the submarine reached the neighbouring waters of Yalta. At 6:36, they spotted a patrol vessel and kept watch. Around 8:05, sub-lieutenant Constantin Stegaru spotted a large transport vessel on a course of 290, steaming for Yalta. At 8:15, the ship turned to the left, closing on the submarine. The CO decided to wait for the ship to pass behind him and shot from an aft tube. At 8:43, Delfinul launched a torpedo from tube 6, from 800 metres (870 yd) away. The torpedo explosion, followed by a bigger one, could be heard, moments after the launch. It is possible that the ship was not escorted because the first contact with a submarine hunter ship came an hour after the attack. The depth charging lasted from 10:30 until 18:30 (6:30 pm). There were 23 passes and 80 to 90 explosions from depth charges. During the attack, Căpitan (USN rank – Lieutenant) Constantin Costăchescu dove the submarine deeper and deeper, and when the enemy was listening, he would stop the submarine's machinery. Afterwards, they went near the Turkish coast, but a dreadful storm made the trip home a difficult venture. Căpitan (USN rank – Lieutenant) Constantin Costăchescu was later awarded the Order of Michael the Brave 3rd Class for the attack. The alleged sunken Soviet ship was claimed to be the 1,975-ton cargo Uralets (also known as Uralles). However, according to modern evaluations, the ship was sunk by the Luftwaffe on 30 October, during an air raid on Yevpatoria, and the torpedo attack missed the minelayer Ostrovsky The latter claim, however, is highly unlikely, as the crew of Delfinul reported to have heard an explosion seconds after launching the torpedo. The struck ship was most likely the Soviet tanker Kreml, which was damaged.

=== Patrol 6 ===
The mission of the sixth patrol was to cut the Russian communication routes between Batumi and Istanbul. Delfinul left port on 30 November, but because of bad weather, it was forced to return to base on 3 December 1941.

=== Patrol 7 ===
The seventh patrol (6–13 December) took Delfinul back to the Batumi-Istanbul line. It didn't detect any enemy convoys. On its way back, it detected two Russian submarines near Constanța.

=== Patrol 8 ===
The first patrol of 1942 (18–30 May) found Delfinul under the command of Locotenent Commander (USN rank – Lieutenant Commander) Constantin Lungu, who had been promoted. It patrolled the north side of the Turkish coast without detecting anything. It was attacked by two Russian planes on 27 May without sustaining any damage.

=== Patrol 9 ===
The last patrol of Delfinul (25 June – 3 July 1942) was carried out near Yalta. On 27 June, they arrived in the operation theatre but were forced to stay submerged because of enemy aircraft. Between 4:26 and 15:30 (3:30 pm) Delfinul was the target of 240 anti-submarine bombs. A fuel tank cracked. After 16:00 (4:00 pm), an enemy patrol craft appeared, and Căpitan (USN rank – Lieutenant) Costăchescu ordered a complete stop on the electric motors. The next day, the submarine was spotted on the surface by an enemy aircraft at 16:12 (4:12 pm). Some bullets damaged its conning tower. On 1 July, the last day of the Sevastopol evacuation, the Russian flotilla was very active in the Crimean zone, so Delfinul was spotted and hunted for 13 hours. Between 7:35 and 10:30, there were counted 107 depth charges. Around 13:00 (1:00 pm), there was an attack with 20 bombs, and at 15:40 (3:40 pm) another 24. In the evening, between 19:30 (7:30 pm) and 20:00 (8:00 pm), 82 depth charges and bombs exploded near the submarine and 35 away from it. In total 268 explosions, mainly air dropped anti-submarine bombs and a few depth charges. After the patrol ended, the submarine was sent for a total refit at the Galați shipyard, arriving there on 24 November.

== The end ==
After the 23 August 1944 coup, the submarine was confiscated by Soviet forces and commissioned as TS-3 on 20 October 1944. After a short career in the Soviet Navy, it was decommissioned on 12 October 1945. The submarine was eventually returned to Romania in 1951 and stricken in 1957.

== The legacy ==
The name Delfinul was passed to the only Romanian Navy submarine still in service today. It was bought from the Russians in the 1980s and is an improved diesel-electric attack Kilo-class submarine. The new Delfinul is still waiting for its new battery packs since the early 1990s.

== Audaces Fortuna Juvat ==
Delfinul is the most successful Romanian submarine of all time. The Romanian Submarine Service had its motto as the Latin expression: Audaces Fortuna Juvat, which means "Fortune favors the bold" (rom.-"Norocul îi ajută pe cei îndrăzneți").

== Bibliography ==
- Koslinski N., Stanescu R. (1996). Marina Romana in al Doilea Razboi Mondial. Vol. I. Editura Fat-Frumos.
