= List of ship launches in 1904 =

Fjustice

The list of ship launches in 1904 includes a chronological list of some ships launched in 1904.

Date	Ship	Class	Builder	Location	Country	Notes
4 January	Esturgeon	Naïade-class submarine	Arsenal de Toulon	Toulon	France	for the French Navy
4 January	Kouang-Si	Steamship	Forges et Chantiers de la Méditerranée	Le Havre	France	For:Est Asiatique Français
7 January	Ludion	Naïade-class submarine	Arsenal de Cherbourg	Cherbourg	France	for the French Navy
4 February	New Zealand	King Edward VII-class battleship	Portsmouth Dockyard	Portsmouth	United Kingdom	For Royal Navy
6 February	Bonite	Naïade-class submarine	Arsenal de Toulon	Toulon	France	for the French Navy
7 February	Expansion	twin-screw schooner	W. A. Boole & Son	Oakland, California	United States	
23 February	Aigrette	Aigrette-class submarine	Arsenal de Toulon	Toulon	France	For French Navy
3 March	Worcestershire	Passenger ship	Harland & Wolff	Belfast	United Kingdom	For Bibby Line.
16 March	Phoque	Naïade-class submarine	Arsenal de Rochefort	Rochefort	France	for the French Navy
16 March	Espoir	Self‑propelled paddle‑wheel barge	Forges et Chantiers de la Méditerranée	Le Havre	France	For:Soc. des Messageries fluviales de France
26 March	Lübeck	Bremen-class cruiser	AG Vulcan Stettin	Stettin	Germany	For Imperial German Navy
28 March	Z	Submarine	Arsenal de Rochefort	Rochefort	France	for the French Navy
31 March	Dunluce Castle	Passenger ship	Harland & Wolff	Belfast	United Kingdom	For Union-Castle Line.
6 April	Virginia	Virginia-class battleship	Newport News Shipbuilding	Newport News, Virginia	United States	For United States Navy
16 April	Otarie	Naïade-class submarine	Arsenal de Rochefort	Rochefort	France	for the French Navy
18 April	Kurt	Barque	William Hamilton & Co. Ltd.	Port Glasgow	United Kingdom	For G. H. J. Siemers & Co.
21 April	Souffleur	Naïade-class submarine	Arsenal de Toulon	Toulon	France	for the French Navy
30 April	Erzherzog Friedrich	Erzherzog Karl-class battleship	Stabilimento Tecnico Triestino	Trieste	Austria-Hungary	For Austro-Hungarian Navy
30 April	Démocratie	Liberté-class battleship	Arsenal de Brest	Brest	France	For French Navy
30 April	München	Bremen-class cruiser	AG Weser	Bremen	Germany	For Imperial German Navy
14 May	Yorck	Roon-class cruiser	Blohm + Voss	Hamburg	Germany	For Imperial German Navy
14 May	Dorade	Naïade-class submarine	Arsenal de Cherbourg	Cherbourg	France	for the French Navy
17 May	Rhode Island	Virginia-class battleship	Fore River Shipbuilding Company	Quincy, Massachusetts	United States	For United States Navy
17 May	Slievemore	Ferry	Harland & Wolff	Belfast	United Kingdom	For London and North Western Railway
27 May	Lothringen	Braunschweig-class battleship	Schichau-Werke	Danzig	Germany	For Imperial German Navy
15 June	Maarten Harpertszoon Tromp	Coastal defence ship	Rijkswerf	Amsterdam	Netherlands	For Royal Netherlands Navy
15 June	Méduse	Naïade-class submarine	Arsenal de Rochefort	Rochefort	France	for the French Navy
19 June	Regina Elena	Regina Elena-class battleship	La Spezia Naval Base	La Spezia	Italy	For Regia Marina
30 June	Pardo	Cargo ship	Harland & Wolff	Belfast	United Kingdom	For Royal Mail Line.
14 July	Amiral Ponty	Steel, screw steamer; 5,554 GRT	Ateliers et Chantiers de la Loire	Saint-Nazaire	France	For: Chargeurs Réunis
16 July	Grondin	Naïade-class submarine	Arsenal de Toulon	Toulon	France	for the French Navy
18 July	Saint Brieuc	Steamship	Chantriers de la Brosse et Fouché	Nantes	France	For: Le Gaules de Mézaubran
3 August	Anguille	Naïade-class submarine	Arsenal de Toulon	Toulon	France	for the French Navy
27 August	Dansborg	Cargo ship	Blyth Shipbuilding & Dry Docks Co. Ltd	Blyth	United Kingdom	For A/S D/S Neptun.
27 August	Hornsea	Cargo ship	Blyth Shipbuilding & Dry Docks Co. Ltd	Blyth	United Kingdom	For Sea Steamship Co. Ltd.
27 August	Louisiana	Connecticut-class battleship	Newport News Shipbuilding	Newport News, Virginia	United States	For United States Navy
8 September	Grasmere	Coaster	Blyth Shipbuilding & Dry Docks Co. Ltd	Blyth	United Kingdom	For Grasmere Steamship Co. Ltd.
10 September	Potaro	Cargo ship	Harland & Wolff	Belfast	United Kingdom	For Royal Mail Line.
10 September	Paris	Self‑propelled paddle‑wheel barge	Forges et Chantiers de la Méditerranée	Le Havre	France	For:Soc. des Messageries fluviales de France
24 September	Mamari	Passenger ship	Harland & Wolff	Belfast	United Kingdom	For Shaw, Savill & Albion Line.
24 September	Lille	Self‑propelled paddle‑wheel barge	Forges et Chantiers de la Méditerranée	Le Havre	France	For:Soc. des Messageries fluviales de France
26 September	Oursin	Naïade-class submarine	Arsenal de Rochefort	Rochefort	France	for the French Navy
28 September	Douai	Self‑propelled paddle‑wheel barge	Forges et Chantiers de la Méditerranée	Le Havre	France	For:Soc. des Messageries fluviales de France
29 September	Connecticut	Connecticut-class battleship	New York Naval Yard	Brooklyn, New York	United States	For United States Navy
1 October	Cambrai	Self‑propelled paddle‑wheel barge	Forges et Chantiers de la Méditerranée	Le Havre	France	For:Soc. des Messageries fluviales de France
7 October	Nebraska	Virginia-class battleship	Moran Brothers	Seattle, Washington	United States	For United States Navy
11 October	Georgia	Virginia-class battleship	Bath Iron Works	Bath, Maine	United States	For United States Navy
12 October	Vittorio Emanuele	Regina Elena-class battleship	Castellammare Royal Dockyard	Castellammare di Stabia	Italy	For Regia Marina
13 October	Alose	Naïade-class submarine	Arsenal de Toulon	Toulon	France	for the French Navy
15 October	Saint Quentin	Self‑propelled paddle‑wheel barge	Forges et Chantiers de la Méditerranée	Le Havre	France	For:Soc. des Messageries fluviales de France
27 October	Justice	Liberté-class battleship	Forges et Chantiers de la Méditerranée	La Seyne	France	For French Navy
October	Craigronald	Merchant ship	Blohm & Voss		Germany	Later named Glyndwr
8 November	Black Prince	Duke of Edinburgh-class cruiser	Thames Ironworks	Leamouth, London	United Kingdom	For Royal Navy
8 November	Cigogne	Aigrette-class submarine	Arsenal de Toulon	Toulon	France	For French Navy
10 November	New Jersey	Virginia-class battleship	Fore River Shipbuilding Company	Quincy, Massachusetts	United States	For United States Navy
15 November	X	Submarine	Arsenal de Cherbourg	Cherbourg	France	for the French Navy
19 November	Deutschland	Deutschland-class battleship	Germaniawerft	Kiel	Germany	For Imperial German Navy
23 November	Hudson	Mixed cargo passenger vessel	fr:Chantiers de Normandie	Grand-Quevilly	France	For Cie. Générale Transatlantique
10 December	Britannia	King Edward VII-class battleship	Portsmouth Dockyard	Portsmouth	United Kingdom	For Royal Navy
Unknown date	Alcyon	Fishing trawler	Bonn & Mees	Rotterdam	Netherlands	For private owner
Unknown date	Dover Castle	Ocean Liner	Barclay, Curle & Co. Ltd.	Glasgow	United Kingdom	For Union Castle Line.
Unknown date	Ellen	Lighter	Brown & Clapson	Barton-upon-Humber	United Kingdom	For Samuel Cook.
Unknown date	Excellent	Steam drifter	Beeching Brothers Ltd.	Great Yarmouth	United Kingdom	For George Garden Sr.
Unknown date	Freya	Steam trawler	Hall, Russell & Co. Ltd.	Aberdeen	United Kingdom	For Fishing Board of Scotland.
Unknown date	Haddington	Cargo ship	Bertram Engine Works Co. Ltd	Toronto	Canada	For private owner.
Unknown date	Hans	Barque	William Hamilton & Co. Ltd.	Port Glasgow	United Kingdom	For a German owner.
Unknown date	Kathleen	Lighter	Brown & Clapson	Barton-upon-Humber	United Kingdom	For Avenue Lighter Co. Ltd.
Unknown date	Kingfisher	Tug	J. P. Rennoldson & Sons	South Shields	United Kingdom	For private owner.
Unknown date	Lebanon	Steam drifter	Beeching Brothers Ltd.	Great Yarmouth	United Kingdom	For .
Unknown date	Olive	Steam drifter	Beeching Brothers Ltd.	Great Yarmouth	United Kingdom	For William Smith Jr.
Unknown date	Rose	Steam drifter	Beeching Brothers Ltd.	Great Yarmouth	United Kingdom	For William Findlay.
Unknown date	Silvain	Fishing trawler	M. van der Kuijl	Rotterdam	Netherlands	For Stoomvisserij Maatschappij Mercurius
Unknown date	W 24	Hopper barge			United Kingdom	For Admiralty.
Unknown date	Unnamed	Lighter	Brown & Clapson	Barton-upon-Humber	United Kingdom	For Mr. Sleight.
