= List of ship launches in 1903 =

The list of ship launches in 1903 is a chronological list of ships launched in 1903. In cases where no official launching ceremony was held, the date built or completed may be used instead.

| Date | Ship | Class and type | Builder | Location | Country | Notes |
|---|---|---|---|---|---|---|
| 12 January | Constitución | Swiftsure-class battleship | Armstrong Whitworth | Elswick | United Kingdom | for the Chilean Navy, sold to the Royal Navy before delivery. |
| 14 January | Pike | Plunger-class submarine | Union Iron Works | San Francisco, California | United States | for the United States Navy, sponsored by Mrs. Frank Baker Zahm |
| 15 January | Libertad | Swiftsure-class battleship | Vickers, Sons & Maxim | Barrow-in-Furness | United Kingdom | for the Chilean Navy, sold to the Royal Navy before delivery. |
| 15 January | Suffolk | Monmouth-class cruiser | Portsmouth Dockyard | Portsmouth | United Kingdom | for the Royal Navy |
| 16 January | Ville de Rouen | — | Forges et Chantiers de la Méditerranée | Le Havre | France | for: Soc. Anonyme de Vapeur Longs Courriers |
| 17 January | Épieu | Arquebuse-class destroyer | Forges et Chantiers de la Méditerranée | Le Havre | France | for the French Navy |
| 31 January | Lagunitas | stern wheel ferry | W. A. Boole & Son | Oakland, California | United States | |
| 4 February | S117 | S90-class torpedo boat | Schichau-Werke | Elbing | Germany | for the Imperial German Navy |
| 13 February | Eden | River-class destroyer | Hawthorn Leslie | Newcastle upon Tyne | United Kingdom | for the Royal Navy |
| 9 February | Nishin | Kasuga-class cruiser | Ansaldo | Genoa | Italy | for the Imperial Japanese Navy |
| 14 February | Derwent | River-class destroyer | Hawthorn Leslie | Newcastle upon Tyne | United Kingdom | for the Royal Navy |
| 19 February | Servian | Passenger ship | Harland & Wolff | Belfast | United Kingdom | for the Wilson & Furness-Leyland Line |
| 26 February | Columbus | Passenger ship | Harland & Wolff | Belfast | United Kingdom | For Dominion Line |
| 28 February | White Swan | Cargo ship | Blyth Shipbuilding & Dry Docks Co. Ltd | Blyth | United Kingdom | For Swan Line Ltd. |
| February | Dakota | Passenger ship | Eastern Shipbuilding Company | Groton, Connecticut | United States | for the Great Northern Steamship Company |
| 3 March | Petschili | Barque | Blohm+Voss | Hamburg | Germany | for F. Laeisz |
| 7 March | Chattanooga | Denver-class cruiser | Crescent Shipyard | Elizabethport, New Jersey | United States | for the United States Navy |
| 9 March | A3 | A-class submarine | Vickers | Barrow in Furness | United Kingdom | for the Royal Navy |
| 18 March | Clan Macalister | Cargo ship | Archibald McMillan & Son | Dumbarton | United Kingdom | For Clan Line |
| 18 March | Yarmouth | Cargo ship | Gourlay Brothers | Dundee | United Kingdom | For the Great Eastern Railway |
| 21 March | S118 | S90-class torpedo boat | Schichau-Werke | Elbing | Germany | for the Imperial German Navy |
| 26 March | Cameronian | Coaster | Blyth Shipbuilding & Dry Docks Co. Ltd | Blyth | United Kingdom | For F. B. Cameron. |
| 1 April | Catapulte | Arquebuse-class destroyer | Forges et Chantiers de la Méditerranée | Le Havre | France | for the French Navy |
| 4 April | The Queen | Passenger ship | William Denny & Bros | Dumbarton | United Kingdom | for the South Eastern and Chatham Railway |
| 9 April | Marmora | Passenger ship | Harland & Wolff | Belfast | United Kingdom | For Peninsular & Oriental Steam Navigation Company. |
| 15 April | A2 | A-class submarine | Vickers | Barrow in Furness | United Kingdom | for the Royal Navy |
| 16 April | Minnesota | Passenger ship | Eastern Shipbuilding Company | Groton, Connecticut | United States | for the Great Northern Steamship Company |
| 18 April | West Virginia | Pennsylvania-class cruiser | Newport News Shipbuilding | Newport News, Virginia | United States | for the United States Navy |
| 25 April | Colorado | Pennsylvania-class cruiser | William Cramp & Sons | Philadelphia, Pennsylvania | United States | for the United States Navy |
| 28 April | Arbalète | Arquebuse-class destroyer | Chantiers et Ateliers Augustin Normand | Le Havre | France | for the French Navy |
| 6 May | Eastland | Passenger ship | Jenks Shipbuilding Company | | United States | for the Michigan Steamship Company |
| 13 May | Commonwealth | King Edward VII-class battleship | Fairfield Shipbuilding and Engineering Company | Govan | United Kingdom | for the Royal Navy |
| 13 May | Clan Macneil | Turret type Cargo ship | William Doxford & Sons | Pallion | United Kingdom | for Clan Line |
| 14 May | Greenwood | cargo ship | Blyth Shipbuilding & Dry Docks Co. Ltd | Blyth | United Kingdom | For Tyneside Line Ltd. |
| 20 May | Almaz | Cruiser | Baltic Shipyard | Saint Petersburg | Russia | for the Imperial Russian Navy |
| 22 May | Ionic | Athenic-class ocean liner | Harland & Wolff | Belfast | United Kingdom | for the White Star Line |
| 26 May | Elsass | Braunschweig-class battleship | Schichau | Danzig | Germany | for the Imperial German Navy |
| 29 May | Pistolet | Arquebuse-class destroyer | Ateliers et Chantiers de la Loire | Nantes | France | for the French Navy |
| 29 May | Bélier | Arquebuse-class destroyer | Ateliers et Chantiers de la Loire | Nantes | France | for the French Navy |
| 2 June | Tacoma | Denver-class cruiser | Union Iron Works | Mare Island, California | United States | for the United States Navy |
| 9 June | A4 | A-class submarine | Vickers | Barrow in Furness | United Kingdom | for the Royal Navy |
| 13 June | Brighton | Passenger ship | William Denny & Brothers | Dumbarton | United Kingdom | for the London, Brighton and South Coast Railway |
| 26 June | Bombarde | Arquebuse-class destroyer | Forges et Chantiers de la Méditerranée | Le Havre | France | for the French Navy |
| 27 June | Roon | Roon-class armored cruiser | Kaiserliche Werft | Kiel | Germany | for the Imperial German Navy |
| 2 July | Iméréthie | Steel, schooner-rigged screw steamer; 3,400 GRT | Forges et Chantiers de la Méditerranée | La Seyne | France | for the Compagnie de Navigation Arménienne et Marocaine |
| 2 July | B.H.C. High Ferry No. 1 | Chain Ferry | Blyth Shipbuilding & Dry Docks Co. Ltd | Blyth | United Kingdom | For Blyth Harbour Commissioners. |
| 8 July | S119 | S90-class torpedo boat | Schichau-Werke | Elbing | Germany | for the Imperial German Navy |
| 9 July | Bremen | Bremen-class cruiser | AG Weser | Bremen | Germany | for the Imperial German Navy |
| 9 July | Macedonia | Passenger ship | Harland & Wolff | Belfast | United Kingdom | For Peninsular & Oriental Steam Navigation Company. |
| 23 July | Galveston | Denver-class cruiser | William R. Trigg Company | Richmond, Virginia | United States | for the United States Navy |
| 23 July | King Edward VII | King Edward VII-class battleship | Devonport Dockyard | Devonport | United Kingdom | for the Royal Navy |
| 25 July | Hamburg | Bremen-class cruiser | AG Vulcan | Stettin | Germany | for the Imperial German Navy |
| 25 July | Mecidiye | Protected cruiser | William Cramp & Sons | Philadelphia, Pennsylvania | United States | for the Ottoman Navy |
| 25 July | Mongolia | Cargo liner | New York Shipbuilding | Camden, New Jersey | United States | for the Pacific Mail Steamship Company |
| 30 July | Malou | Steel, schooner-rigged screw steamer; 5,579 GRT | Forges et Chantiers de la Méditerranée | La Seyne | France | for Eugene Salles |
| July | Regina Elena | Barque | Società Esercizio Baccini | Genoa | Italy | for Pietro Milesi, Genoa |
| 1 August | Zhemchug | Protected cruiser | Sredne-Nevsky Shipyard | Saint Petersburg | Russia | for the Imperial Russian Navy |
| 8 August | Helsingfors | Passenger ship | Chantier Naval Anversois | Antwerp | Belgium | For Helsingfors Ångfartygs Aktiebolaget |
| 11 August | Armadale Castle | Passenger ship | Fairfield Shipbuilding and Engineering | Govan | United Kingdom | For the Union-Castle Line |
| 22 August | Loutre | Naïade-class submarine | Arsenal de Rochefort | Rochefort | France | for the French Navy |
| 22 August | Pennsylvania-class cruiser | For the United States Navy | William Cramp & Sons,|Philadelphia, Pennsylvania | Pennsylvania | United States | |
| 25 August | Dominion | King Edward VII-class battleship | Vickers | Barrow in Furness | United Kingdom | for the Royal Navy |
| August | Slava | Borodino-class battleship | Baltic Shipyard | Saint Petersburg | Russia | for the Imperial Russian Navy |
| 10 September | Dard | Arquebuse-class destroyer | Ateliers et Chantiers de Saint-Nazaire Penhoët | Le Grand-Quevilly | France | for the French Navy |
| 12 September | Maryland | Pennsylvania-class cruiser | Newport News Shipbuilding | Newport News, Virginia | United States | for the United States Navy |
| 18 September | Hessen | Braunschweig-class battleship | Germaniawerft | Kiel | Germany | for the Imperial German Navy |
| 22 September | Berlin | Bremen-class cruiser | Kaiserliche Werft Danzig | Danzig | Germany | For the Imperial German Navy |
| 22 September | Yunnan | Steel, schooner-rigged, twin-screw steamer | Forges et Chantiers de la Méditerranée | Le Havre | France | For Est Asiatique Français |
| 23 September | Redwood | Cargo ship | Blyth Shipbuilding & Dry Docks Co. Ltd | Blyth | United Kingdom | For Tyneside Line Ltd. |
| 24 September | Hampshire | Devonshire-class cruiser | Armstrong-Whitworth | Elswick | United Kingdom | for the Royal Navy |
| September | Pacific | Cable ship | Burmeister & Wain | Copenhagen | Denmark | for the Great Northern Telegraph Company |
| 1 October | Izumrud | Cruiser | Sredne-Nevsky Shipyard | Saint Petersburg | Russia | for the Imperial Russian Navy |
| 4 October | Erzherzog Karl | Erzherzog Karl-class battleship | Stabilimento Tecnico Triestino | Trieste | Austria-Hungary | For the Austro-Hungarian Navy |
| 7 October | Carnarvon | Devonshire-class cruiser | William Beardmore and Company | Clydebank | United Kingdom | for the Royal Navy |
| 8 October | Antrim | Devonshire-class cruiser | John Brown & Company | Clydebank | United Kingdom | for the Royal Navy |
| 8 October | President Lincoln | Passenger ship | Harland & Wolff | Belfast | United Kingdom | For Hamburg America Line. |
| 8 October | Protée | Naïade-class submarine | Arsenal de Cherbourg | Cherbourg | France | for the French Navy |
| 10 October | Alma Doepel | Schooner | | Bellingen | Australia | |
| 22 October | Baliste | Arquebuse-class destroyer | Ateliers et Chantiers de Saint-Nazaire Penhoët | Le Grand-Quevilly | France | for the French Navy |
| 30 October | Preussen | Braunschweig-class battleship | AG Vulkan | Stettin | Germany | for the Imperial German Navy |
| 2 November | Manchuria | Ocean liner | New York Shipbuilding Co. | Camden, New Jersey | United States | for the Pacific Mail Steamship Co. |
| 2 November | Otowa | Cruiser | Yokosuka Naval Arsenal | Yokosuka, Kanagawa | Japan | for the Imperial Japanese Navy |
| 5 November | Castor | Naïade-class submarine | Arsenal de Rochefort | Rochefort | France | for the French Navy |
| 7 November | Enchantress | Yacht | Harland & Wolff | Belfast | United Kingdom | For Admiralty |
| 21 November | Baltic | Ocean liner | Harland & Wolff | Belfast | United Kingdom | for the White Star Line |
| 24 November | Lynx | Naïade-class submarine | Arsenal de Cherbourg | Cherbourg | France | for the French Navy |
| 1 December | Perle | Naïade-class submarine | Arsenal de Toulon | Toulon | France | for the French Navy |
| 1 December | Manligheten | Äran-class coastal defence ship | Kockums Shipyard | Malmö | Sweden | for the Royal Swedish Navy |
| 15 December | Kenilworth Castle | Passenger ship | Harland & Wolff | Belfast | United Kingdom | For Union-Castle Line. |
| 17 December | Durham Castle | Ocean liner | Fairfield Shipbuilding and Engineering Company | Govan | United Kingdom | for the Union-Castle Line |
| 17 December | Patrie | République-class battleship | Forges et Chantiers de la Méditerranée | La Seyne | France | for the French Navy |
| 19 December | Hindustan | King Edward VII-class battleship | John Brown & Company | Clydebank | United Kingdom | for the Royal Navy |
| 19 December | Servian | Passenger ship | Harland & Wolff | Belfast | United Kingdom | For Hamburg America Line. |
| December | Sankt Georg | Armoured cruiser | | Pola | Austria-Hungary | for the Austro-Hungarian Navy |
| 2nd Quarter | W.B.C. No. 1 | Hopper barge | Blyth Shipbuilding & Dry Docks Co. Ltd | Blyth | United Kingdom | For Wallsend Borough Council. |
| Unknown date | Atalanta | Steam drifter | Beeching Brothers Ltd. | Great Yarmouth | United Kingdom | For Lewis Duthie. |
| Unknown date | Ant | Steam drifter | Beeching Brothers Ltd. | Great Yarmouth | United Kingdom | For Great Yarmouth Steam Drifters Ltd. |
| Unknown date | Boy George | Steam drifter | Beeching Brothers Ltd. | Great Yarmouth | United Kingdom | For Charles A. Webster. |
| Unknown date | Faith | Lighter | Brown & Clapson | Barton-upon-Humber | United Kingdom | For John Charles Raper. |
| Unknown date | Isabella Ferguson | Steam drifter | Beeching Brothers Ltd. | Great Yarmouth | United Kingdom | For Catherine McLaren. |
| Unknown date | John Crerar | Cargo ship | Chicago Shipbuilding Company. | Chicago, Illinois | United States | For private owner. |
| Unknown date | Lively Hope | Steam drifter | Beeching Brothers Ltd. | Great Yarmouth | United Kingdom | For William Gardiner. |
| Unknown date | Magnet | Steam drifter | Beeching Brothers Ltd. | Great Yarmouth | United Kingdom | For James Farquhar. |
| Unknown date | Rubicon | Steam drifter | Beeching Brothers Ltd. | Great Yarmouth | United Kingdom | For Alexander Clark. |
| Unknown date | Thurne | Steam drifter | Beeching Brothers Ltd. | Great Yarmouth | United Kingdom | For Great Yarmouth Steam Drifters Ltd. |
