= French submarine Alose (1904) =

Naïade-class submarine of the Romazotti type

Coordinates: 43.239529°N 5.402407°E

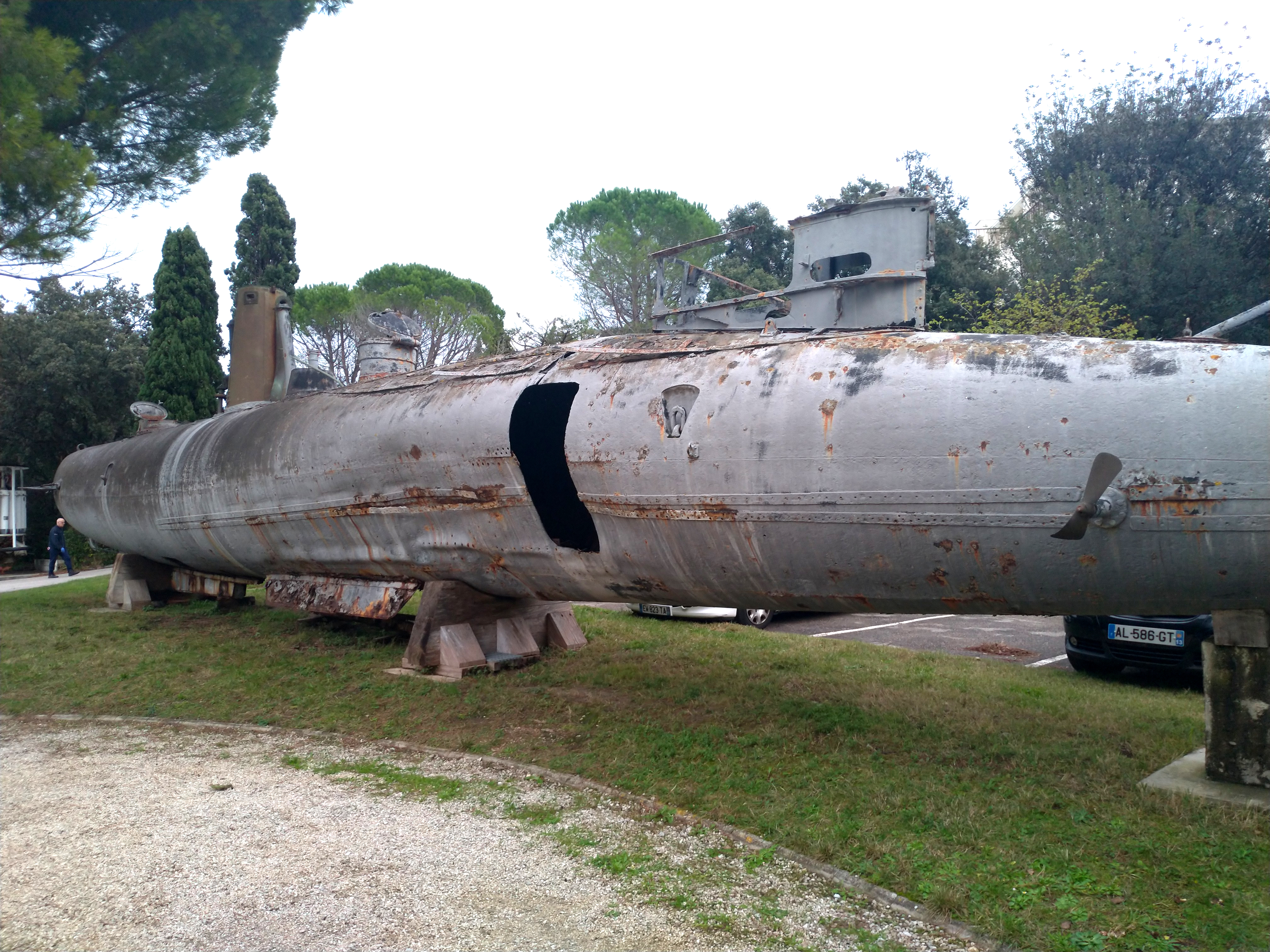
- The wreckage of Alose seen at the COMEX offices in 2019

History

France
- Name: Alose
- Namesake: Shad
- Ordered: 3 April 1901
- Builder: Arsenal de Toulon
- Laid down: 17 November 1902
- Launched: 13 October 1904
- Commissioned: 31 July 1907
- Stricken: 21 May 1914
- Fate: Sunk as target, 28 March 1918; raised 27 May 1976 and preserved as museum ship

General characteristics
- Class & type: Naïade-class submarine
- Displacement: 70 t (69 long tons), (surfaced); 74 t (73 long tons) (submerged)
- Length: 23.7 m (77 ft 9 in)
- Beam: 2.3 m (7 ft 7 in)
- Draft: 2.6 m (8 ft 6 in)
- Installed power: 65 PS (64 bhp; 48 kW) (petrol engine); 70 PS (69 bhp; 51 kW) (electric motor)
- Propulsion: 1 × shaft; diesel-electric powertrain; 1 × benzol engine; 1 × electric motor
- Speed: 7.2 knots (13.3 km/h; 8.3 mph) (surfaced); 5.3 kn (9.8 km/h; 6.1 mph) (submerged)
- Range: 200 nmi (370 km; 230 mi) at 5.5 knots (10.2 km/h; 6.3 mph) (surfaced); 30 nmi (56 km; 35 mi) at 4.1 kn (7.6 km/h; 4.7 mph) (submerged)
- Test depth: 30 m (98 ft)
- Complement: 9
- Armament: 2 × single 450 mm (17.7 in) torpedo launchers

French submarine Alose (Q33) (“Shad”) is a Naïade-class submarine of the Romazotti type that was built for the French Navy at the beginning of the 20th century. Alose remained in service until just prior to the outbreak of World War I in 1914.

== Design and description ==
The Naïade class was designed by Gaston Romazotti, an early French submarine engineer and director of the Arsenal de Cherbourg to a specification for a small coastal-defense submarine. They were of a single-hull design, derived from the first French submarine, Gymnote, but with a Diesel–electric powertrain. The hull was constructed of Roma-bronze, a copper alloy devised by Romazotti to resist corrosion better than steel. The submarines had a surfaced displacement of 70 long tons (71 t) and 74 long tons (75 t) submerged. They measured 23.7 metres (77 ft 9 in) long overall with a beam of 2.3 metres (7 ft 7 in) and draught of 2.6 metres (8 ft 6 in). The crew numbered nine men.

The Naïade's were equipped with a variable-pitch propeller and two auxiliary side-thrusting propellers (French: hélices auxiliaires évolueurs). On the surface, the propeller shaft was driven by two dynamos powered either by the Panhard et Levassor four-cycle benzol engine designed to produce 65 brake horsepower (48 kW) or the batteries used underwater. Speeds attained during the boats' sea trials reached up to 8.2 knots (15.2 km/h; 9.4 mph) from 104 bhp (78 kW). Underwater power for the Naïades was provided by a Société Éclairage Électrique electric motor rated at 70 shaft horsepower (52 kW) and intended to give them a maximum speed of 6 knots (11 km/h; 6.9 mph). Speeds during their sea trials were disappointing at only 5.3 knots (9.8 km/h; 6.1 mph) from 92 shp (69 kW). They were designed to have a range of 30 nautical miles (56 km; 35 mi) at 4.1 knots (7.6 km/h; 4.7 mph) submerged and 200 nautical miles (370 km; 230 mi) at 5.5 knots (10.2 km/h; 6.3 mph) on the surface. The Naïade class were armed with two external single 450 millimetres (17.7 in) torpedo launchers, one aimed forward and the other aft.

== Construction and career ==
Alose was ordered on 3 April 1901 and laid down on 17 November 1902 at the Arsenal de Toulon. The boat was launched on 13 October 1904 and commissioned on 31 July 1907. She was involved in several accidents, though none resulted in serious damage. In November 1906 she was struck by the steamer Mouette in Toulon Roads . In November 1910 she collided with sister ship Bonite, damaging both. Alose was stricken in May 1914 and was used as a target ship, being sunk off Fréjus in March 1918.

In 1975 the wreck was discovered by French divers off Lion rock, near Saint-Raphaël, Var. She was raised and restored as a museum ship in May 1976, and now stands outside the offices of COMEX in Marseille.
