= French submarine Esturgeon =

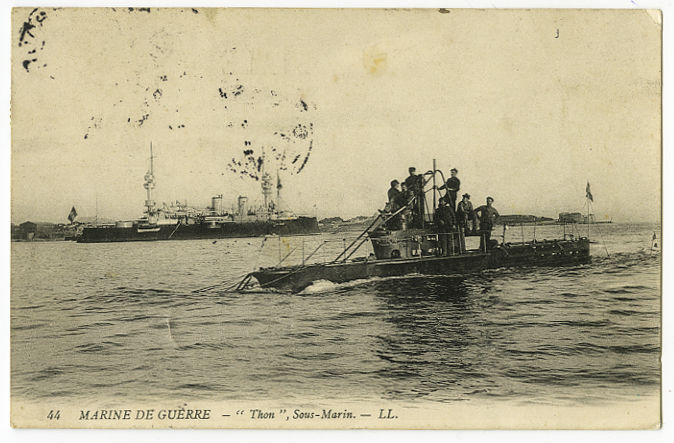
- Sister ship Thon

History

France
- Name: Esturgeon
- Ordered: 3 April 1901
- Builder: Arsenal de Toulon
- Laid down: 26 April 1902
- Launched: 4 January 1904
- Commissioned: 12 April 1904
- Stricken: 8 December 1914
- Fate: Sold for scrap, 1 February 1913

General characteristics
- Class & type: Naïade-class submarine
- Displacement: 70 t (69 long tons), (surfaced); 74 t (73 long tons) (submerged)
- Length: 23.7 m (77 ft 9 in)
- Beam: 2.3 m (7 ft 7 in)
- Draft: 2.6 m (8 ft 6 in)
- Installed power: 65 PS (64 bhp; 48 kW) (petrol engine); 70 PS (69 bhp; 51 kW) (electric motor)
- Propulsion: 1 × shaft; diesel-electric powertrain; 1 × benzol engine; 1 × electric motor
- Speed: 7.2 knots (13.3 km/h; 8.3 mph) (surfaced); 5.3 kn (9.8 km/h; 6.1 mph) (submerged)
- Range: 200 nmi (370 km; 230 mi) at 5.5 knots (10.2 km/h; 6.3 mph) (surfaced); 30 nmi (56 km; 35 mi) at 4.1 kn (7.6 km/h; 4.7 mph) (submerged)
- Test depth: 30 m (98 ft)
- Complement: 9
- Armament: 2 × single 450 mm (17.7 in) torpedo launchers

Esturgeon was one of 20 Naïade-class submarines built for the French Navy at the beginning of the 20th century.

== Design and description ==
The Naïade class was designed by Gaston Romazotti, an early French submarine engineer and director of the Arsenal de Cherbourg to a specification for a small coastal-defense submarine. They were of a single-hull design, derived from the first French submarine, Gymnote, but with a Diesel–electric powertrain. The hull was constructed of Roma-bronze, a copper alloy devised by Romazotti to resist corrosion better than steel. The submarines had a surfaced displacement of 70 long tons (71 t) and 74 long tons (75 t) submerged. They measured 23.7 metres (77 ft 9 in) long overall with a beam of 2.3 metres (7 ft 7 in) and draught of 2.6 metres (8 ft 6 in). The crew numbered nine men.

The Naïade's were equipped with a variable-pitch propeller and two auxiliary side-thrusting propellers (French: hélices auxiliaires évolueurs). On the surface, the propeller shaft was driven by two dynamos powered either by the Panhard et Levassor four-cycle benzol engine designed to produce 65 brake horsepower (48 kW) or the batteries used underwater. Speeds attained during the boats' sea trials reached up to 8.2 knots (15.2 km/h; 9.4 mph) from 104 bhp (78 kW). Underwater power for the Naïades was provided by a Société Éclairage Électrique electric motor rated at 70 shaft horsepower (52 kW) and intended to give them a maximum speed of 6 knots (11 km/h; 6.9 mph). Speeds during their sea trials were disappointing at only 5.3 knots (9.8 km/h; 6.1 mph) from 92 shp (69 kW). They were designed to have a range of 30 nautical miles (56 km; 35 mi) at 4.1 knots (7.6 km/h; 4.7 mph) submerged and 200 nautical miles (370 km; 230 mi) at 5.5 knots (10.2 km/h; 6.3 mph) on the surface. The Naïade class were armed with two external single 450-millimetre (17.7 in) torpedo launchers, one aimed forward and the other aft.

== Construction and career ==
Esturgeon was ordered on 3 April 1901 and laid down on 26 April 1902 at the Arsenal de Toulon. The boat was launched on 4 January 1904 and commissioned on 8 December.
