= Q25 =

Q25 may refer to:

- Q25 (New York City bus)
- Al-Furqan, the 25th surah of the Quran
- Changhe Q25, a Chinese crossover vehicle
- Dinsmore Airport (California)
- French submarine Loutre, a Naïade-class submarine
