= Q30 =

Q30 may refer to:

- Q30 (New York City bus)
- Ar-Rum, the 30th surah of the Quran
- French submarine Oursin (Q30), a Naïade-class submarinev
- Infiniti Q30, an automobile
- Q30 Television, at Quinnipiac University
