= Q23 =

Q23 may refer to:

- Q23 (New York City bus)
- Al-Mu’minun, the 23rd surah of the Quran
- French submarine Lynx (Q23), a Naïade-class submarine
- ITU-T Recommendation Q.23, a telephony standard
- London Underground Q23 Stock
