= Q22 =

Q22 may refer to:

- Q22 (New York City bus), a bus route in Queens
- Q22 (building), a skyscraper in Warsaw
- Al-Hajj, the 22nd surah of the Quran
- ARA Ingeniero Gadda (Q-22), a repair ship of the Argentine Navy
- Chery Q22, a Chinese minivan
- French submarine Dorade (Q22), a Naïade-class submarine
- P.J. O'Shea Stakes, an Australian thoroughbred horse race also known as the Q22, raced in Queensland over 2200m.
