= Q32 =

Q32 may refer to:

- Q32 (New York City bus)
- AN/FSQ-32, an American military computer
- As-Sajdah, the 32nd surah of the Quran
- French submarine Anguille (Q32), a Naïade-class submarine
