= French submarine Souffleur =

Two submarines of the French Navy have borne the name Souffleur:

- French submarine Souffleur (1904), a Naïade-class submarine launched in 1904 and stricken in 1914
- French submarine Souffleur (1924), a Requin-class submarine launched in 1924 and sunk in 1941
