= Q31 =

Q31 may refer to:

- Q31 (New York City bus)
- French submarine Grondin (Q31), a Naïade-class submarine
- IBM AN/FSQ-31 SAC Data Processing System
- London Underground Q31 Stock
- Luqman (sūrah), of the Quran
- Sequoia Field, an airport serving Visalia, California, United States
