= Q17 =

Q17 may refer to:

- Q17 (New York City bus)
- Al-Isra', the seventeenth surah of the Quran
- Boonville Airport (California)
- French submarine Perle (Q17), a Naïade-class submarine
