= Q21 =

Q21 may refer to:

- Q21 (New York City bus)
- Al-Anbiya, the twenty-first surah of the Quran
- Chery Q21, a Chinese minivan
- French submarine Souffleur (Q21), a Naïade-class submarine
