= Q27 =

Q27 may refer to:

- Q27 (New York City bus)
- An-Naml, the 27th surah of the Quran
- French submarine Phoque (Q27), a Naïade-class submarine
- London Underground Q27 Stock
