= Q16 =

Q-16 or Q16 may refer to:

- Q16 (New York City bus), a bus route in Queens
- An-Nahl, the sixteenth surah of the Quran
- French submarine Protée (Q16), a Naïade-class submarine
- Q_{16}, a generalized quaternion group
