= French submarine Romazotti =

Romazotti
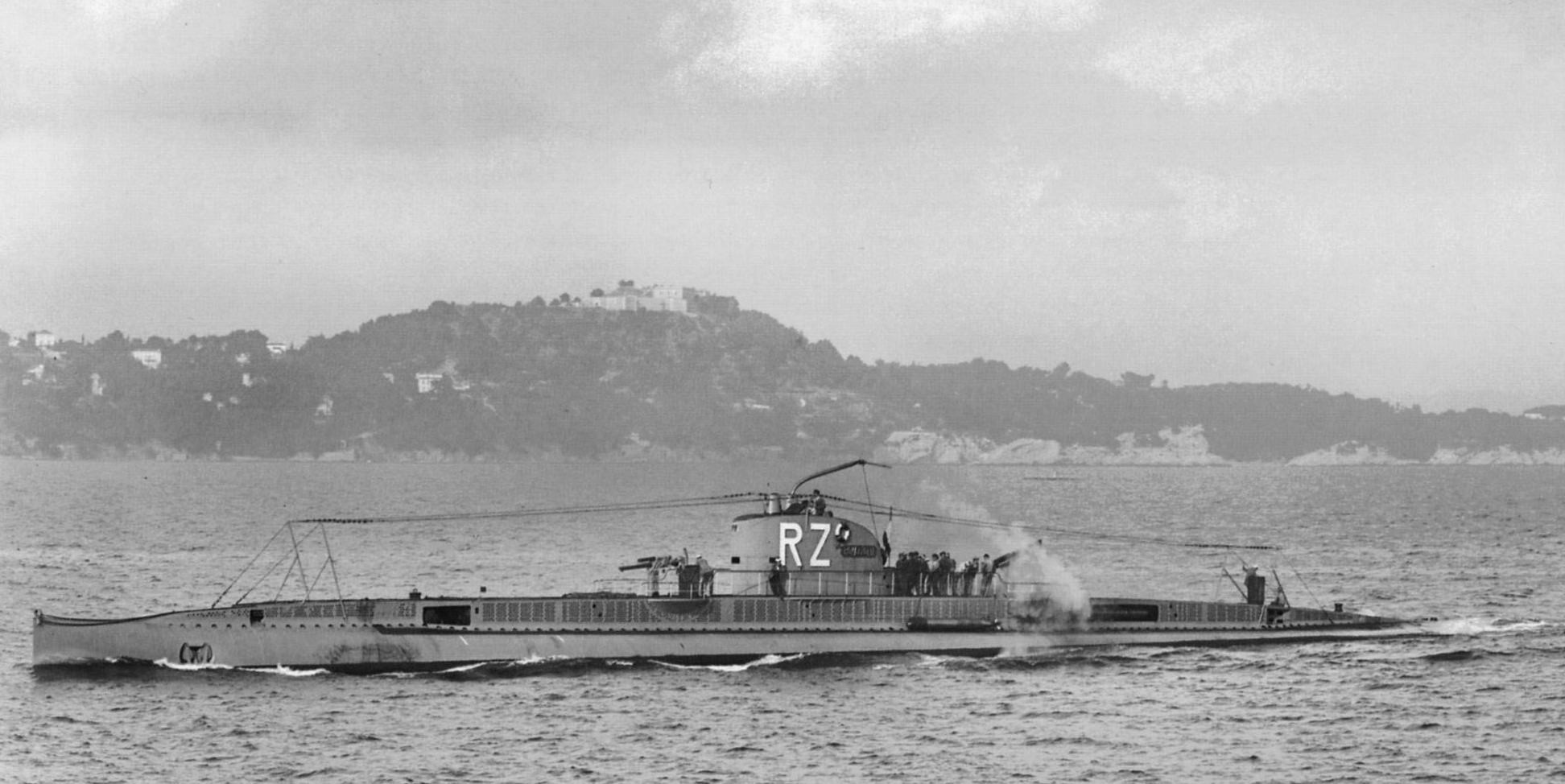
- Romazotti between 1922 and 1923

History

France
- Name: Romazotti
- Namesake: Gaston Romazzotti
- Builder: Arsenal de Toulon
- Laid down: 1914
- Launched: 31 March 1918
- Completed: September 1918
- Commissioned: 1918
- Out of service: 1937
- Fate: Stricken and sold for scrap in 1937

General characteristics
- Type: Submarine
- Displacement: 920 tonnes (905 long tons) (surfaced); 1,318 tonnes (1,297 long tons) (submerged)
- Length: 75.2 m (246 ft 9 in)
- Beam: 6.3 m (20 ft 8 in)
- Draught: 3.6 m (11 ft 10 in)
- Propulsion: 2 × diesel engines, 2,600 hp (1,939 kW); 2 × electric motors, 1,640 hp (1,223 kW)
- Speed: 16.5 knots (30.6 km/h; 19.0 mph) (surfaced); 11 knots (20 km/h; 13 mph) (submerged)
- Range: 4,300 nautical miles (8,000 km; 4,900 mi) at 10 knots (19 km/h; 12 mph); 125 nautical miles (232 km; 144 mi) at 5 knots (9.3 km/h; 5.8 mph) (submerged)
- Test depth: 50 m (160 ft)
- Complement: 47
- Armament: 8 × 450 mm (17.7 in) torpedo tubes; 2 × 75 mm (3.0 in) deck guns; 2 × 8 mm (0.31 in) machine guns

The French submarine Romazotti (Q114) was a Lagrange-class submarine built for the French Navy built between 1914 and 1918, during World War I. It was laid down in the Arsenal de Toulon shipyards and launched on 31 March 1918. Romazotti was completed in 1918 and served in the French Marine Nationale until 1937.

== Design ==
The Lagrange class submarines were constructed as part of the French fleet's expansion programmes from 1913 to 1914. The ships were designed by Julien Hutter, slightly modifying his previous project Dupuy de Lôme, using two Parsons steam turbines with a power of 2,000 hp (1,491 kW). During construction, though, the idea was abandoned and the ships were instead equipped with diesel engines.

75.2 m (246 ft 9 in) long, with a beam of 6.3 m (20 ft 8 in) and a draught of 3.6 m (11 ft 10 in), Lagrange-class submarines could dive up to 50 m (160 ft). The submarine had a surfaced displacement of 920 tonnes (905 long tons) and a submerged displacement of 1,318 tonnes (1,297 long tons). Propulsion while surfaced was provided by two 2,600 hp (1,939 kW) diesel motors built by the Swiss manufacturer Sulzer and two 1,640 hp (1,223 kW) electric motors. The submarines' electrical propulsion allowed it to attain speeds of 11 knots (20 km/h; 13 mph) while submerged and 16.5 knots (30.6 km/h; 19.0 mph) on the surface. Their surfaced range was 7,700 nautical miles (14,300 km) at 9 knots (17 km/h), and 4,000 nautical miles (7,400 km) at 12 knots (22 km/h), with a submerged range of 70 nautical miles (130 km) at 5 knots (9.3 km/h).

The ships were equipped with eight 450 mm torpedo tubes (four in the bow, two stern and two external), with a total of 10 torpedoes and two on-board guns. The class was also armed with a 75 mm with an ammo supply of 440 shells. The crew of one ship consisted of four officers and 43 of officers and seamen.

== Service history ==
Romazotti was built in the Arsenal de Toulon. It was laid down in 1914, launched on 31 March 1918, and completed in 1918. It was named in honor of the distinguished French nineteenth-century naval engineer Gaston Romazotti. Romazotti served in the Mediterranean Sea until 1937.
