= French submarine Protée (1903) =

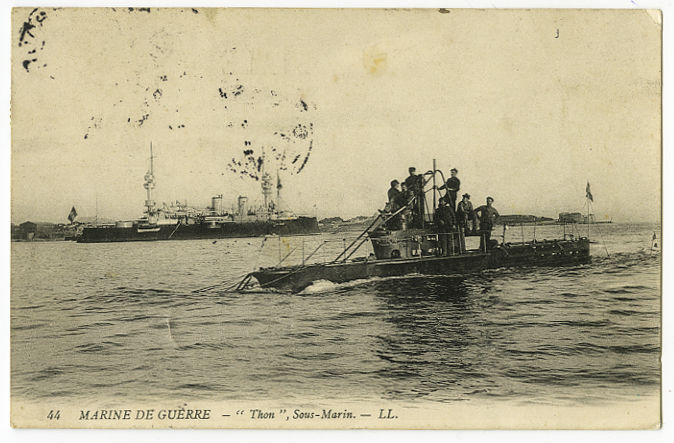
- Sister ship Thon

History

France
- Name: Protée
- Ordered: 3 April 1901
- Builder: Cherbourg Naval Dockyard
- Laid down: 1 April 1902
- Launched: 8 October 1903
- Commissioned: 12 April 1904
- Stricken: 21 May 1914
- Fate: Sold for scrap, 3 March 1920

General characteristics
- Class & type: Naïade-class submarine
- Displacement: 70 t (69 long tons), (surfaced); 74 t (73 long tons) (submerged)
- Length: 23.7 m (77 ft 9 in)
- Beam: 2.3 m (7 ft 7 in)
- Draft: 2.6 m (8 ft 6 in)
- Installed power: 65 PS (64 bhp; 48 kW) (petrol engine); 70 PS (69 bhp; 51 kW) (electric motor)
- Propulsion: 1 × shaft; diesel-electric powertrain; 1 × benzol engine; 1 × electric motor
- Speed: 7.2 knots (13.3 km/h; 8.3 mph) (surfaced); 5.3 kn (9.8 km/h; 6.1 mph) (submerged)
- Range: 200 nmi (370 km; 230 mi) at 5.5 knots (10.2 km/h; 6.3 mph) (surfaced); 30 nmi (56 km; 35 mi) at 4.1 kn (7.6 km/h; 4.7 mph) (submerged)
- Test depth: 30 m (98 ft)
- Complement: 9
- Armament: 2 × single 450 mm (17.7 in) torpedo launchers

Protée was one of 20 Naïade-class submarines built for the French Navy at the beginning of the 20th century. She was of the Romazotti type, and remained in service until just prior to the outbreak of World War I in 1914.

== Design and description ==
The Naïade class was designed by Gaston Romazotti, an early French submarine engineer and director of the Arsenal de Cherbourg to a specification for a small coastal-defense submarine. They were of a single-hull design, derived from the first French submarine, Gymnote, but with a Diesel–electric powertrain. The hull was constructed of Roma-bronze, a copper alloy devised by Romazotti to resist corrosion better than steel. The submarines had a surfaced displacement of 70 long tons (71 t) and 74 long tons (75 t) submerged. They measured 23.7 metres (77 ft 9 in) long overall with a beam of 2.3 metres (7 ft 7 in) and draught of 2.6 metres (8 ft 6 in). The crew numbered nine men.

The Naïade's were equipped with a variable-pitch propeller and two auxiliary side-thrusting propellers (French: hélices auxiliaires évolueurs). On the surface, the propeller shaft was driven by two dynamos powered either by the Panhard et Levassor four-cycle benzol engine designed to produce 65 brake horsepower (48 kW) or the batteries used underwater. Speeds attained during the boats' sea trials reached up to 8.2 knots (15.2 km/h; 9.4 mph) from 104 bhp (78 kW). Underwater power for the Naïades was provided by a Société Éclairage Électrique electric motor rated at 70 shaft horsepower (52 kW) and intended to give them a maximum speed of 6 knots (11 km/h; 6.9 mph). Speeds during their sea trials were disappointing at only 5.3 knots (9.8 km/h; 6.1 mph) from 92 shp (69 kW). They were designed to have a range of 30 nautical miles (56 km; 35 mi) at 4.1 knots (7.6 km/h; 4.7 mph) submerged and 200 nautical miles (370 km; 230 mi) at 5.5 knots (10.2 km/h; 6.3 mph) on the surface. The Naïade class were armed with two external single 450-millimetre (17.7 in) torpedo launchers, one aimed forward and the other aft.

== Construction and career ==
Protée was ordered on 3 April 1901 and laid down on 1 April 1902 at the Arsenal de Cherbourg. The boat was launched on 8 October 1903 and commissioned on 12 April 1904. She was condemned on 27 March 1914 and stricken from the navy list on 21 May.
