= Q15 =

Q15 may refer to:

- Q15 (New York City bus)
- Al Hejr, the fifteenth surah of the Quran
- ARA Cormorán (Q-15), a hydrographic survey boat of the Argentine Navy
- French submarine Naïade (Q15)
