= Q33 =

Q33 may refer to:

- Q33 (New York City bus)
- Al-Aḥzāb, the 33rd surah of the Quran
- French submarine Alose (Q33)
- Q33 NY, a controversy surrounding the font Windings
