= French submarine Grondin =

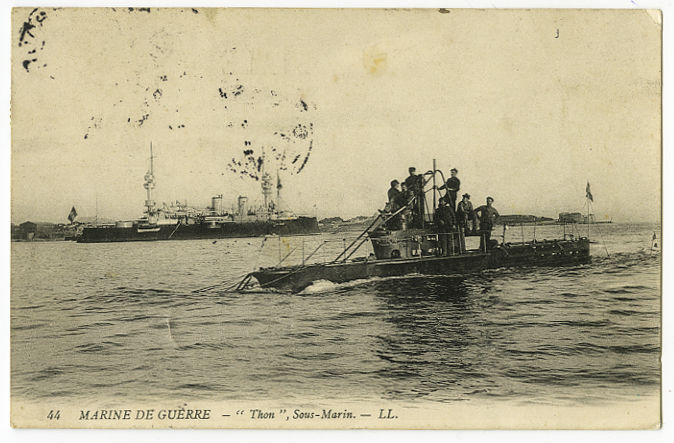
- Sister ship Thon

History

France
- Name: Grondin
- Ordered: 3 April 1901
- Builder: Arsenal de Toulon
- Laid down: 12 September 1902
- Launched: 16 July 1904
- Commissioned: 31 January 1906
- Stricken: 21 May 1914
- Fate: Sold for scrap, 15 November 1913

General characteristics
- Class & type: Naïade-class submarine
- Displacement: 70.5 t (69.4 long tons), (surfaced); 73.6 t (72.4 long tons) (submerged)
- Length: 24 m (78 ft 9 in)
- Beam: 2.26 m (7 ft 5 in)
- Draft: 2.54 m (8 ft 4 in)
- Installed power: 65 PS (64 bhp; 48 kW) (petrol engine); 70 PS (69 bhp; 51 kW) (electric motor)
- Propulsion: 1 × shaft; 1 × petrol engine; 1 × electric motor
- Speed: 7.2 knots (13.3 km/h; 8.3 mph) (surfaced); 6 kn (11 km/h; 6.9 mph) (submerged)
- Range: 200 nmi (370 km; 230 mi) at 5.5 knots (10.2 km/h; 6.3 mph) (surfaced); 30 nmi (56 km; 35 mi) at 4.1 kn (7.6 km/h; 4.7 mph) (submerged)
- Test depth: 30 m (98 ft)
- Complement: 9
- Armament: 2 × single 450 mm (17.7 in) torpedoes in Drzewiecki drop collars

Grondin was one of 20 Naïade-class submarines built for the French Navy at the beginning of the 20th century. She was of the Romazotti type, and remained in service until just prior to the outbreak of World War I in 1914.
