= French submarine Phoque (1904) =

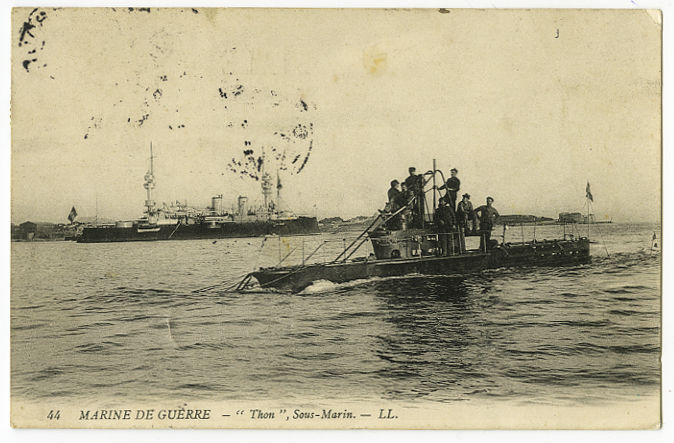
- Sister ship Thon

History

France
- Name: Phoque
- Ordered: 3 April 1901
- Builder: Arsenal de Rochefort
- Laid down: 9 April 1903
- Launched: 16 March 1904
- Commissioned: 28 February 1905
- Stricken: 21 May 1914
- Fate: Probably sold for scrap, date unknown

General characteristics
- Class & type: Naïade-class submarine
- Displacement: 70.5 t (69.4 long tons), (surfaced); 73.6 t (72.4 long tons) (submerged)
- Length: 24 m (78 ft 9 in)
- Beam: 2.26 m (7 ft 5 in)
- Draft: 2.54 m (8 ft 4 in)
- Installed power: 65 PS (64 bhp; 48 kW) (petrol engine); 70 PS (69 bhp; 51 kW) (electric motor)
- Propulsion: 1 × shaft; 1 × petrol engine; 1 × electric motor
- Speed: 7.2 knots (13.3 km/h; 8.3 mph) (surfaced); 6 kn (11 km/h; 6.9 mph) (submerged)
- Range: 200 nmi (370 km; 230 mi) at 5.5 knots (10.2 km/h; 6.3 mph) (surfaced); 30 nmi (56 km; 35 mi) at 4.1 kn (7.6 km/h; 4.7 mph) (submerged)
- Test depth: 30 m (98 ft)
- Complement: 9
- Armament: 2 × single 450 mm (17.7 in) torpedoes in Drzewiecki drop collars

Phoque was one of 20 Naïade-class submarines built for the French Navy at the beginning of the 20th century. She was of the Romazotti type, and remained in service until just prior to the outbreak of World War I in 1914.
