= USS Louisiana =

Five ships of the United States Navy have borne the name USS Louisiana in honor of the 18th state.

- USS Louisiana (1812) was a sloop that served in the War of 1812
- USS Louisiana (1861) was a propeller-driven steamer that served in the American Civil War
- USS Louisiana (BB-19) was a Connecticut-class battleship commissioned 2 June 1906 and decommissioned 20 October 1920
- USS Louisiana (BB-71) was a Montana-class battleship cancelled before her keel was laid down
- USS Louisiana (SSBN-743) is an Ohio-class submarine currently in active service

== See also ==
- CSS Louisiana was commissioned by the Confederate States of America during the American Civil War
- USRC Louisiana (1819) was a wood hull topsail schooner that served in the United States Revenue Cutter Service from 1819 to 1824
