= French submarine Dorade =

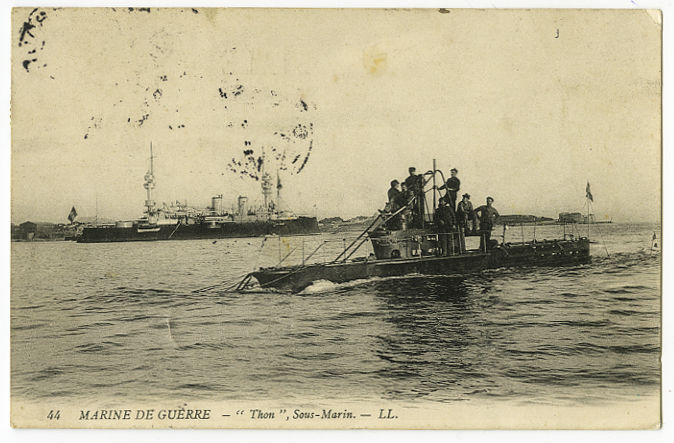
- Sister ship Thon

History

France
- Name: Dorade
- Ordered: 3 April 1901
- Builder: Cherbourg Naval Dockyard
- Laid down: 30 June 1902
- Launched: 14 May 1904
- Commissioned: 26 October 1905
- Stricken: 21 May 1914
- Fate: Sold for scrap, 12 November 1920

General characteristics
- Class & type: Naïade-class submarine
- Displacement: 70.5 t (69.4 long tons), (surfaced); 73.6 t (72.4 long tons) (submerged)
- Length: 24 m (78 ft 9 in)
- Beam: 2.26 m (7 ft 5 in)
- Draft: 2.54 m (8 ft 4 in)
- Installed power: 65 PS (64 bhp; 48 kW) (petrol engine); 70 PS (69 bhp; 51 kW) (electric motor)
- Propulsion: 1 × shaft; 1 × petrol engine; 1 × electric motor
- Speed: 7.2 knots (13.3 km/h; 8.3 mph) (surfaced); 6 kn (11 km/h; 6.9 mph) (submerged)
- Range: 200 nmi (370 km; 230 mi) at 5.5 knots (10.2 km/h; 6.3 mph) (surfaced); 30 nmi (56 km; 35 mi) at 4.1 kn (7.6 km/h; 4.7 mph) (submerged)
- Test depth: 30 m (98 ft)
- Complement: 9
- Armament: 2 × single 450 mm (17.7 in) torpedoes in Drzewiecki drop collars

Dorade was one of 20 Naïade-class submarines built for the French Navy at the beginning of the 20th century. She was of the Romazotti type, and remained in service until just prior to the outbreak of World War I in 1914.
