= French submarine Gymnote (Q1) =

World's first all-electric submarine

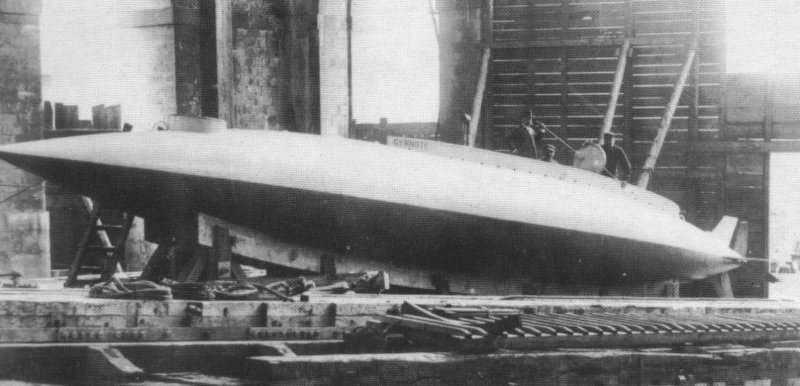
- Gymnote in 1889.

History

France
- Name: Gymnote
- Namesake: Gymnotus
- Laid down: 20 April 1887
- Launched: 24 September 1888
- Decommissioned: 1908
- Fate: Scrapped 1911

General characteristics
- Type: Submarine
- Displacement: 30 tonnes (33 tons)
- Length: 17.8 m (58 ft)
- Propulsion: Electric engine 41 kW (55 hp)
- Speed: 7.3 knots (13.5 km/h; 8.4 mph) surfaced; 4.3 knots (8.0 km/h; 4.9 mph) submerged
- Range: 65 nmi (120 km; 75 mi) at 5.0 knots (9.3 km/h; 5.8 mph) surfaced; 25 nmi (46 km; 29 mi) at 4.3 knots (8.0 km/h; 4.9 mph) submerged
- Complement: 5

Gymnote was one of the world's first all-electric submarines and the first functional submarine equipped with torpedoes.

Launched on 24 September 1888, she was developed in France following early experiments by Henri Dupuy de Lôme, and, after his death in 1885, by Gustave Zédé (1825–1891) and Arthur Krebs, who completed the project. For Gymnote, Arthur Krebs developed the electric engine, the first naval periscope and the first naval electric gyrocompass. The name "Gymnote" refers to the Gymnotids, the "electric eels".

The submarine was built with a steel single hull, a detachable lead keel, and three hydroplanes on each side. She made over 2,000 dives, using 204 cell batteries. She was armed with two 355 mm (14 in) torpedoes.

Gymnote was partly inspired by the earlier development of the submarine Plongeur, the world's first mechanically powered submarine.

== Construction ==
Gymnote was an experimental design and so was subject to continuous changes through its lifetime. The original design was commissioned by Admiral Aube, commenced by Dupuy de Lôme before his death and completed by Gustave Zédé before his. Construction work then fell to Romazotti. The keel was laid on 20 April 1887 at Mourillon Arsenal at Toulon operated by La Société des Forges et Chantiers, of which company Zédé was a director. Trials began on 17 November 1888.

=== Control gear ===
The boat was designed to operate underwater with a small positive buoyancy, so that without power and rudders driving it downwards it would tend to float to the surface. There were three ballast tanks, one in the centre and one on either end. Water could be ejected either using compressed air or electrical pumps. Continuous adjustment was needed during a dive. It was originally equipped only with a stern rudder, which gave poor control. At speeds greater than 6 knots (11 km/h; 6.9 mph) the boat would become unstable. At this speed the boat would be angled down 3-5° to maintain depth, so that the bow would be 1.5 metres (4.9 ft) lower than the stern. Further rudders were added at the centre of the boat in 1893, which as well as improving stability meant that she remained more level during dives.

=== Motor ===
The original sixteen pole electric motor was designed by Captain Krebs to develop 55 horsepower (41 kW) at 200V and 200A. Gustave Zédé asked Krebs to connect the motor directly to the propeller at 200 rpm. It is the reason why the rotor was 1 meter in diameter and weighed 2 tonnes. The motor was constructed and tested at the Société des Forges et Chantiers at Le Havre. It was fitted with two sets of brushes, one for forward and one reverse motion. Once installed it was found that the rear bearing was inaccessible and could not be repaired with the motor installed. It was difficult to inspect the armature or repair damage to the insulation. The motor was not designed to come to an immediate halt when power was disconnected, but instead would freewheel to a halt relatively slowly. Reverse power could not be applied until it had stopped moving, so it was not possible to immediately reverse the propeller in case of emergency. The motor proved so problematic that it was replaced with a smaller but more powerful Sautter-Harlé motor.

=== Batteries ===
The boat was originally fitted with 564 Commelin-Bailhache-Desmazures alkaline cells designed from the Lalande-Chaperon patent which used zinc and copper oxide electrodes with potassium hydroxide electrolyte. These were located all over the ship arranged into six banks of 45 parallel paired cells connected in series. To vary the speed, banks could be connected in different combinations, 6 banks in series giving 150 V and 8 knots, 3 banks in series in parallel with the other 3 in series giving 114 V and 7 knots, 2 banks in series paralleled 3 times giving 84 V and 5.5 knots, all 6 banks in parallel giving 45 V and 6 knots. A bank was capable of delivering a maximum of 166 amps. The whole array weighed eleven tons. A new battery was installed in 1891 using a Laurent-Cely sulphuric acid design having 205 individual 30 kg assemblies of five plates each. Again these were arranged into six banks, now each having 17 parallel pairs of batteries connected in series. At 8 knots (15 km/h; 9.2 mph) range was 32 miles (51 km), at 4 knots (7.4 km/h; 4.6 mph), 100 miles (160 km). Another battery was installed in 1897.

=== Hull ===
The hull was made of 6 mm steel at the centre, tapering to 4 mm at either end with a circular cross section. Internally it was coated with coal tar to provide protection from spilled battery acid. The hull was supported by 31 circular frames with additional longitudinal bracing.

=== Navigation equipment ===
The boat was fitted with several types of periscopes, but they proved unsatisfactory. Diving was delayed by the need to fix or stow the periscope and water seals proved to be unreliable and on a couple of occasions led to dangerous flooding. A small conning tower was added in 1898. The boat had a compass and a gyroscope. Although the latter were not entirely reliable it allowed the Gymnote to force a naval block in 1890. The ship was equipped with two 14-inch torpedo tubes.

== History ==
Gymnote was damaged on 5 March 1907 when she ran aground. Although the submarine placed in a dry dock, a hatch was left open while the dock was being flooded, causing her to flood and sink on 19 June 1907. Repairs were considered too expensive, and she was sold for scrap in 1911.

== See also ==
- Spanish submarine Peral

== Bibliography ==
- Campbell, N. J. M. (1979). "France". In Chesneau, Roger & Kolesnik, Eugene M. (eds.). Conway's All the World's Fighting Ships 1860–1905. Greenwich: Conway Maritime Press. pp. 283–333. ISBN 0-8317-0302-4.
- Garier, Gérard (1995). L'odyssée technique et humaine du sous-marin en France [The Technical and Human Odyssey of the Submarine in France: From Plongeur (1863) to Guêpe (1904)] (in French). Vol. 1: Du Plongeur (1863) aux Guêpe (1904). Bourg-en-Bresse, France: Marines édition. ISBN 2-909675-19-X.
- Roberts, Stephen S. (2021). French Warships in the Age of Steam 1859–1914: Design, Construction, Careers and Fates. Barnsley, UK: Seaforth Publishing. ISBN 978-1-5267-4533-0.
