= Benzole =

Coal-tar product

In the United Kingdom, benzole or benzol is a coal-tar product consisting mainly of benzene and toluene. It was originally used as a "motor spirit", as were petroleum spirits. Benzole was also blended with petrol and sold as a motor fuel under trade names including "National Benzole Mixture" and "Regent Benzole Mixture".

It was commonly produced by coking factories.

== See also ==
- Antiknock agent
