= Naïade-class submarine =

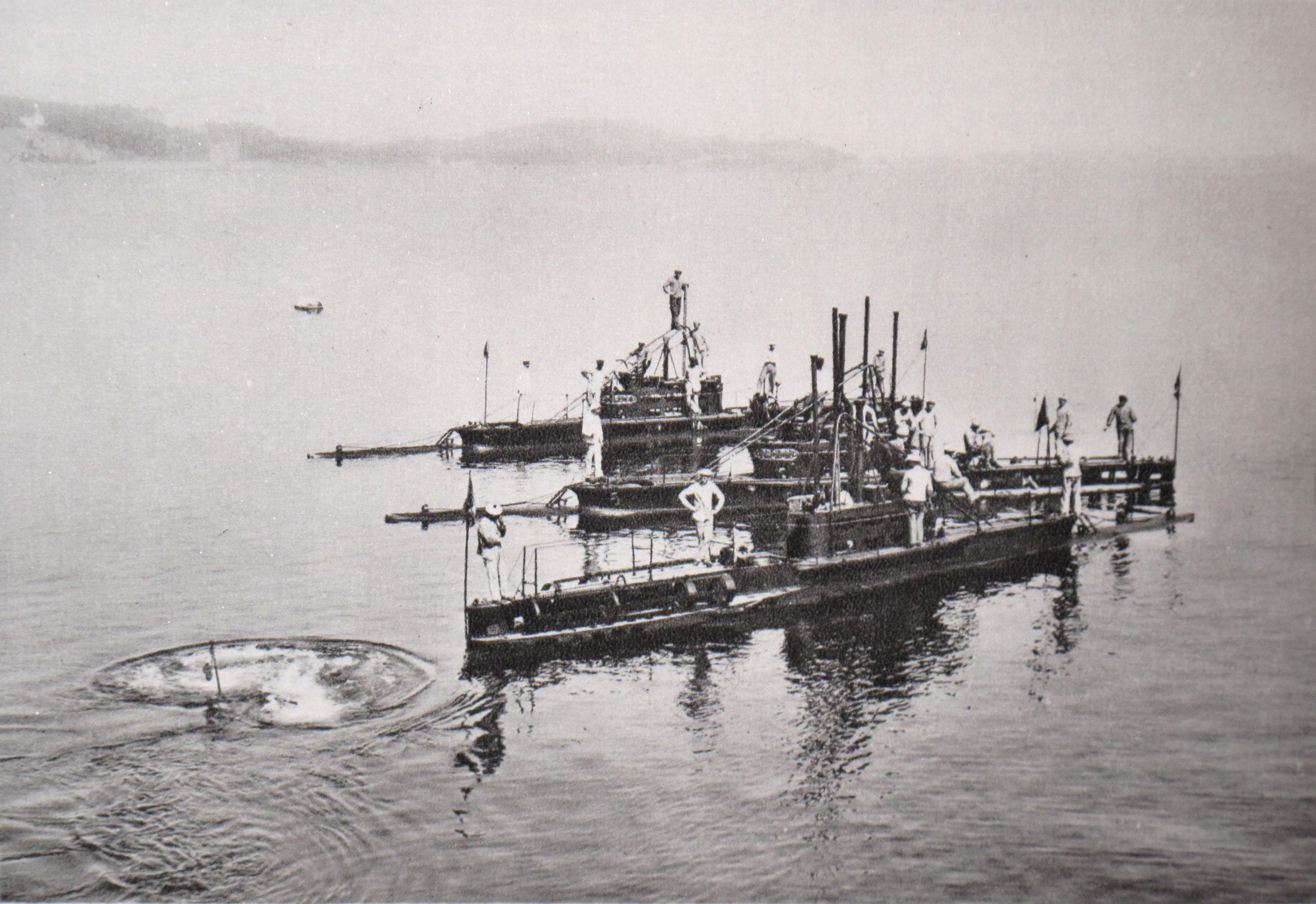
- Three Naïade-class submarines; Grondin (foreground) with two others (not identified).

Class overview
- Name: Naïade class
- Operators: French Navy
- Cost: fr. 365,000 per unit
- Built: 1903–1905
- In commission: 1903–1914
- Completed: 20
- Scrapped: 19
- Preserved: 1

General characteristics
- Type: Submarine
- Displacement: 70 t (69 long tons), (surfaced); 74 t (73 long tons) (submerged)
- Length: 23.7 m (77 ft 9 in)
- Beam: 2.3 m (7 ft 7 in)
- Draft: 2.6 m (8 ft 6 in)
- Installed power: 65 PS (64 bhp; 48 kW) (petrol engine); 70 PS (69 bhp; 51 kW) (electric motor)
- Propulsion: 1 × shaft; diesel-electric powertrain; 1 × benzol engine; 1 × electric motor
- Speed: 7.2 knots (13.3 km/h; 8.3 mph) (surfaced); 5.3 kn (9.8 km/h; 6.1 mph) (submerged)
- Range: 200 nmi (370 km; 230 mi) at 5.5 knots (10.2 km/h; 6.3 mph) (surfaced); 30 nmi (56 km; 35 mi) at 4.1 kn (7.6 km/h; 4.7 mph) (submerged)
- Test depth: 30 m (98 ft)
- Complement: 9
- Armament: 2 × single 450 mm (17.7 in) torpedoes in Drzewiecki drop collars

The Naïade-class submarines, sometimes referred to as the Perle class were a group of submarines built for the French Navy at the beginning of the 20th century. There were twenty vessels in this class, which was designed by Gaston Romazotti. The class introduced internal combustion engines into French submarine design. They remained in service until just prior to the outbreak of the First World War in 1914.

== Design and description ==
The Naïade class was designed by Gaston Romazotti, an early French submarine engineer and director of the Arsenal de Cherbourg to a specification for a small coastal-defense submarine. They were of a single-hull design, derived from the first French submarine, Gymnote, but with a Diesel–electric powertrain. The hull was constructed of Roma-bronze, a copper alloy devised by Romazotti to resist corrosion better than steel. The submarines had a surfaced displacement of 70 long tons (71 t) and 74 long tons (75 t) submerged. They measured 23.7 metres (77 ft 9 in) long overall with a beam of 2.3 metres (7 ft 7 in) and draught of 2.6 metres (8 ft 6 in). The crew numbered nine men.

The Naïade's were equipped with a variable-pitch propeller and two auxiliary side-thrusting propellers (French: hélices auxiliaires évolueurs). On the surface, the propeller shaft was driven by two dynamos powered either by the Panhard et Levassor four-cycle benzol engine designed to produce 65 brake horsepower (48 kW) or the batteries used underwater. Speeds attained during the boats' sea trials reached up to 8.2 knots (15.2 km/h; 9.4 mph) from 104 bhp (78 kW). Underwater power for the Naïades was provided by a Société Éclairage Électrique electric motor rated at 70 shaft horsepower (52 kW) and intended to give them a maximum speed of 6 knots (11 km/h; 6.9 mph). Speeds during their sea trials were disappointing at only 5.3 knots (9.8 km/h; 6.1 mph) from 92 shp (69 kW). They were designed to have a range of 30 nautical miles (56 km; 35 mi) at 4.1 knots (7.6 km/h; 4.7 mph) submerged and 200 nautical miles (370 km; 230 mi) at 5.5 knots (10.2 km/h; 6.3 mph) on the surface. The Naïade class were armed with two single 450 millimetres (17.7 in) torpedoes located externally in Drzewiecki drop collars.

== Assessment ==
The Naïades were smaller than Romazotti's previous Morse and Français-class submarines, smaller in fact than any French submarine to that date except the pioneering Gymnote. However the Naïades had an adequate armament (two torpedoes, carried externally) and a good performance, with a better range than Romazotti's previous designs or the contemporary Farfadet class, though not as good as Narval and Sirène class. They were considered good surface boats, with good maneuverability but erratic when submerged.

== Ships in class ==
Naïade-class submarines
Name	Budget number	Namesake	Builder	Launched	Fate
Alose	Q33	"Shad"	Arsenal de Toulon	12 October 1904	Stricken May 1914; preserved as museum ship
Anguille	Q32	"Eel"	Arsenal de Toulon	8 August 1904	Stricken May 1914
Bonite	Q19	"Bonito"	Arsenal de Toulon	6 February 1904	Stricken May 1914
Castor	Q26	"Beaver"	Arsenal de Rochefort	5 November 1903	Stricken May 1914
Dorade	Q22	"Dorado"	Arsenal de Toulon	5 November 1903	Stricken May 1914
Esturgeon	Q18	"Sturgeon"	Arsenal de Toulon	8 January 1904	Stricken 1912
Grondin	Q31	"Gurnard"	Arsenal de Toulon	15 July 1904	Stricken 1913
Loutre	Q25	"Otter"	Arsenal de Rochefort	25 August 1903	Stricken May 1914
Ludion	Q24	"Diver"	Arsenal de Toulon	18 March 1904	Stricken May 1914
Lynx	Q23	"Lynx"	Arsenal de Cherbourg	24 November 1903	Stricken May 1914
Méduse	Q29	"Jellyfish"	Arsenal de Rochefort	15 June 1904	Stricken May 1914
Naïade	Q15	"Naiad"	Arsenal de Cherbourg	20 February 1904	Stricken May 1914
Otarie	Q28	"Sealion"	Arsenal de Rochefort	16 April 1904	Stricken May 1914
Oursin	Q30	"Urchin"	Arsenal de Rochefort	26 September 1904	Stricken May 1914
Perle	Q17	"Pearl"	Arsenal de Toulon	1 November 1903	Stricken May 1914
Phoque	Q27	"Seal"	Arsenal de Rochefort	16 March 1904	Stricken May 1914
Protée	Q16	"Proteus"	Arsenal de Cherbourg	8 October 1903	Stricken May 1914
Souffleur	Q21	"Dolphin" (lit. "Blower")	Arsenal de Toulon	20 April 1903	Stricken May 1914
Thon	Q20	"Tuna"	Arsenal de Toulon	18 March 1904	Stricken May 1914
Truite	Q34	"Trout"	Arsenal de Toulon	14 April 1905	Stricken May 1914

== Service history ==
The Naïades were ordered as part of the French Navy's 1900 building programme, and were constructed over the next five years at the naval dockyards at Toulon, Rochefort and Cherbourg. The entire class was assigned for service in the Mediterranean Sea apart from the three submarines constructed at Cherbourg which served in the English Channel.

By 1905, they had been reclassified as harbour defence boats. They remained in service until just prior to the outbreak of the First World War, but by then had been superseded by more modern designs and all were stricken by mid-1914. The wreck of Alose which was scuttled during an aerial bombing exercise in 1918, was discovered and raised in May 1975. The vessel is preserved as a museum piece at the headquarters of COMEX (the Compagnie Maritime d'Expertises) in Marseille and was declared a French national historic site in 2008.
