= Toulon arsenal =

French naval base in Toulon, France

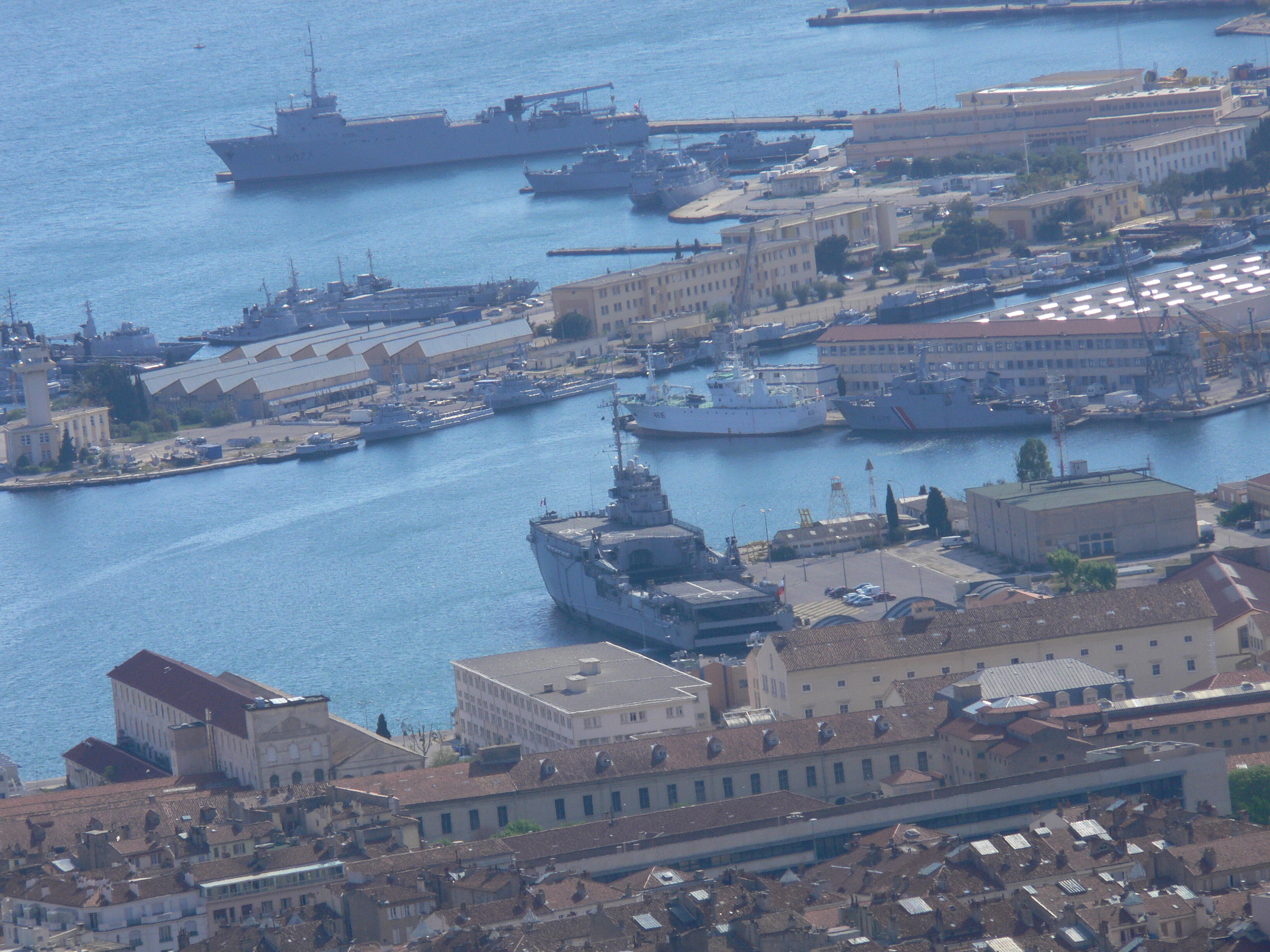
- Toulon arsenal
- Interactive map of Toulon arsenal
- Location within France

Location
- Location: France
- Coordinates: 43°07′10″N 5°54′59″E

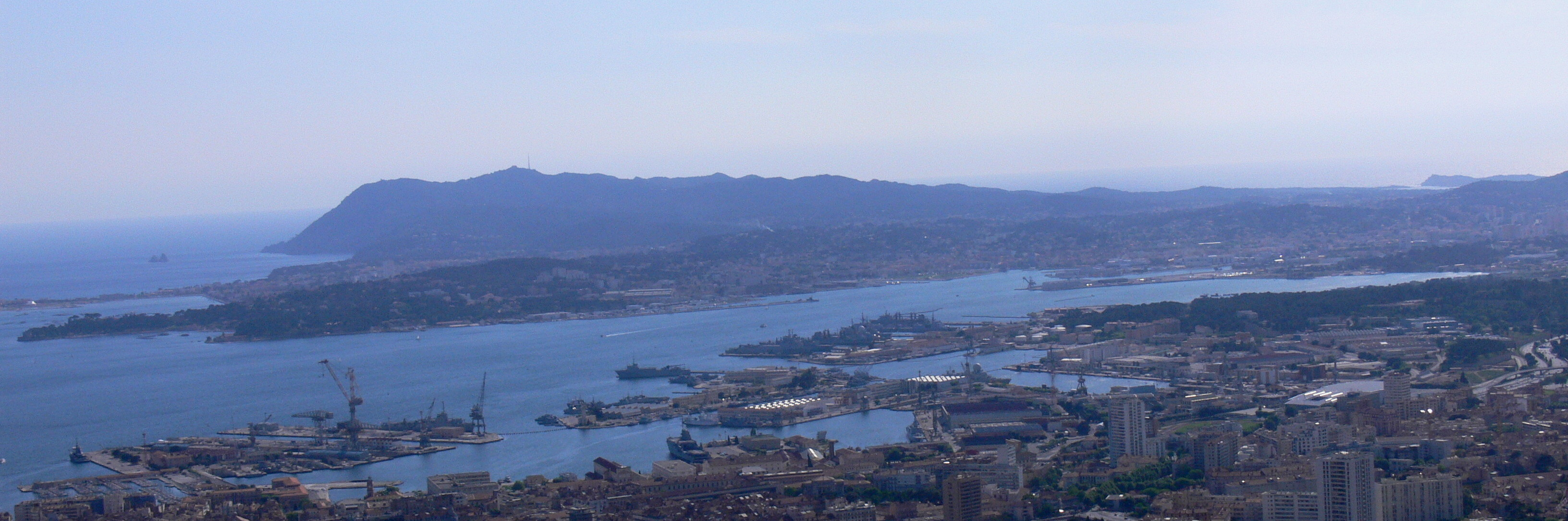
General view of the roadstead of Toulon.

The military port of Toulon (French: arsenal de Toulon) is the principal base of the French Navy and the largest naval base in the Mediterranean and Western Europe, situated in the city of Toulon. It holds most of France's force d'action navale, comprising the aircraft carrier Charles de Gaulle as well as its nuclear attack submarines, in total, the base contains more than 60% of the French Navy's tonnage, and about 20,000 military and civilian personnel work at the base.

== The Rade ==
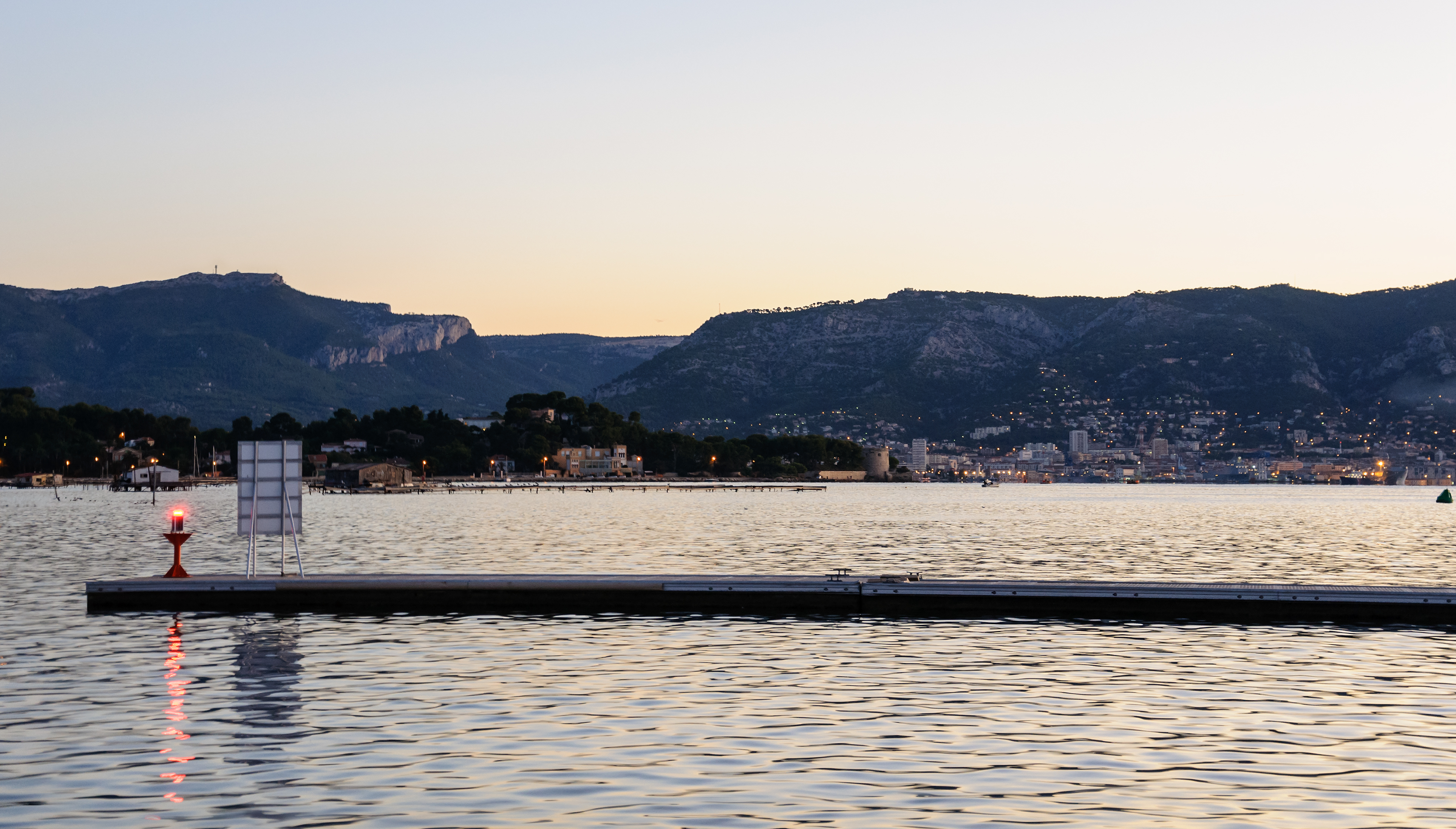
The Rade of Toulon seen from Saint-Mandrier-sur-Mer

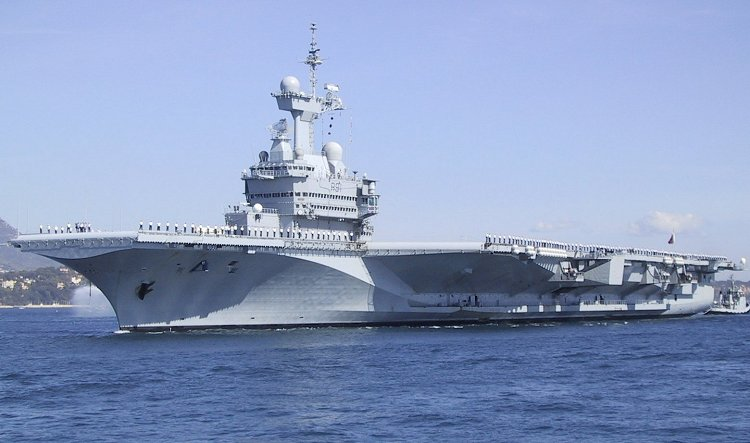
The aircraft carrier Charles De Gaulle in the Rade of Toulon

The word rade comes from the old English term 'Road,' "a protected place near shore, not so enclosed as a harbour, where ships can ride at anchor.". The Rade of Toulon is one of the best natural anchorages on the Mediterranean, and the largest rade in Europe. It is protected from the sea by the peninsula of Giens and the peninsula of Saint-Mandrier-sur-Mer, and has been used as a military harbour since the 15th century. The Rade shelters the port of Saint-Mandrier-sur-Mer, the port of La Seyne-sur-Mer, as well as the arsenal, or military port of Toulon, and the commercial port.

== History ==
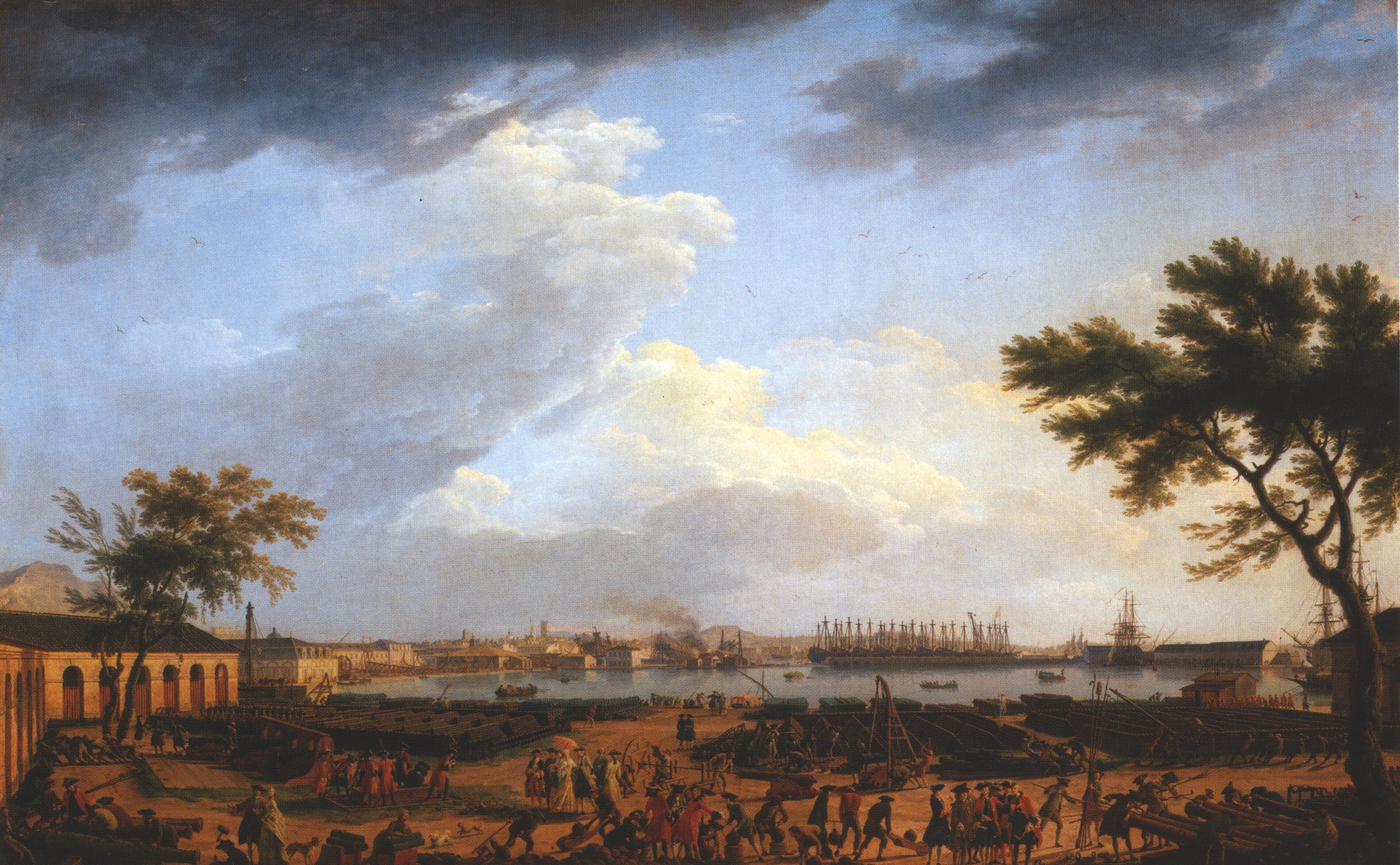
View of Toulon harbour around 1750, by Joseph Vernet.

The 'modern' history of the port began when Louis XII built his Tour Royale at Toulon in 1514. A naval arsenal and shipyard were built in 1599, and small sheltered harbour, the Veille Darse, was built in 1604–1610 to protect ships from the wind and sea. The shipyard was greatly enlarged by Cardinal Richelieu, who wished to make France into a Mediterranean naval power. In 1680, Jean-Baptiste Colbert, Secretary of State of the Navy and Controller of Finance of King Louis XIV, began building a much larger port, called the Darse Vauban or the Darse Neuve, and shipyard, designed by his commissioner of fortifications, Vauban.

In 1697, Vauban built the impressive corderie, a building designed to make ropes. The corderie, still standing, is 20 metres wide and 320 metres long, built so that ropes could be stretched the entire length of the building as they were twisted together. Power for the ropemaking was provided by convicts from the adjoining prison, the Bagne de Toulon, who walked in an enormous treadmill. A triumphal gate (now the Museum of the Navy) was added to the Arsenal in 1738.

The Arsenal port was enlarged still further in the 19th century and the 20th century. The construction of the arsenal du Mourillon began at the start of the 18th century, as an extension of the major Toulon arsenal on the roadstead's east coast. Until the 20th century this extension held stores for the wood to build the French Navy. From the late 19th century it was this shipyard that built France's first ironclad frigates then the world's first modern submarines.

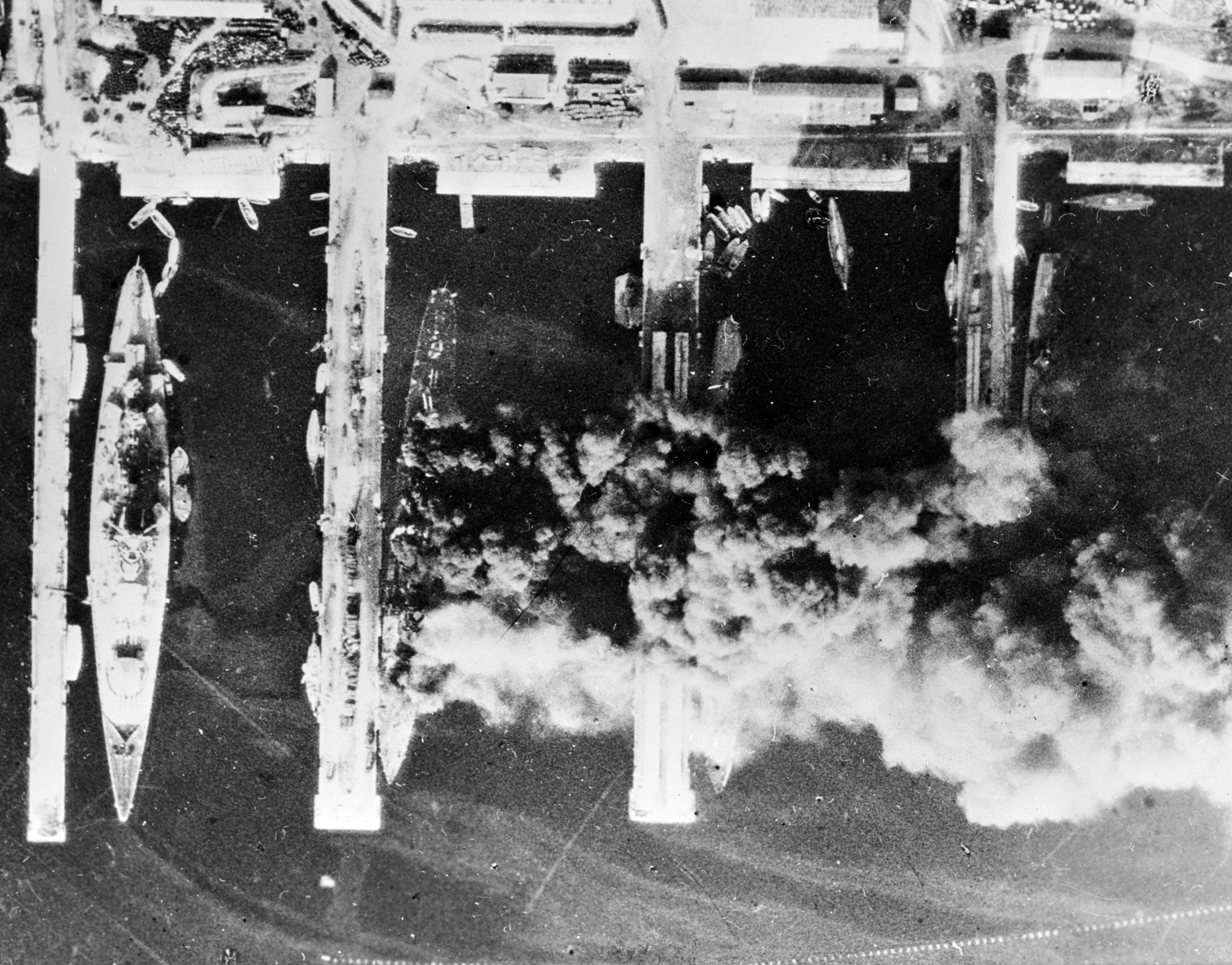
Scuttling of the French fleet at Toulon in 1942 (aerial view)

Rather than joining the Free French forces in North Africa and to avoid capture by the Germans, the French fleet based at Toulon scuttled itself on 27 November 1942 on the orders of the French admiralty. During the 20th century the Mourillon arsenal was mainly dedicated to submarine activity as a French submarine base until 1940, then a German one from 1940 to 1945, then a dockyard and torpedo factory after 1945. The Arsenal was badly damaged by Allied bombing in World War II, but since has been reconstructed and modernised. It has eleven drydocks for ship repair, the two largest of which are 422 metres by 40 metres. The Arsenal is still the principal military port of France, the home port of the aircraft carrier Charles de Gaulle, France's attack submarine squadron, and the other ships of the French Mediterranean fleet.

The Arsenal is not open to the public, but the Naval Museum at its entrance has a collection of enormous ship models from the 18th century, used to train the heir to the throne in seamanship, as well as other naval memorabilia. The building of the Corderie can be seen beside the road nearby. Boat tours depart regularly from the waterfront, and allow visitors to have a good look at ships of the French fleet.

== Main infrastructures ==
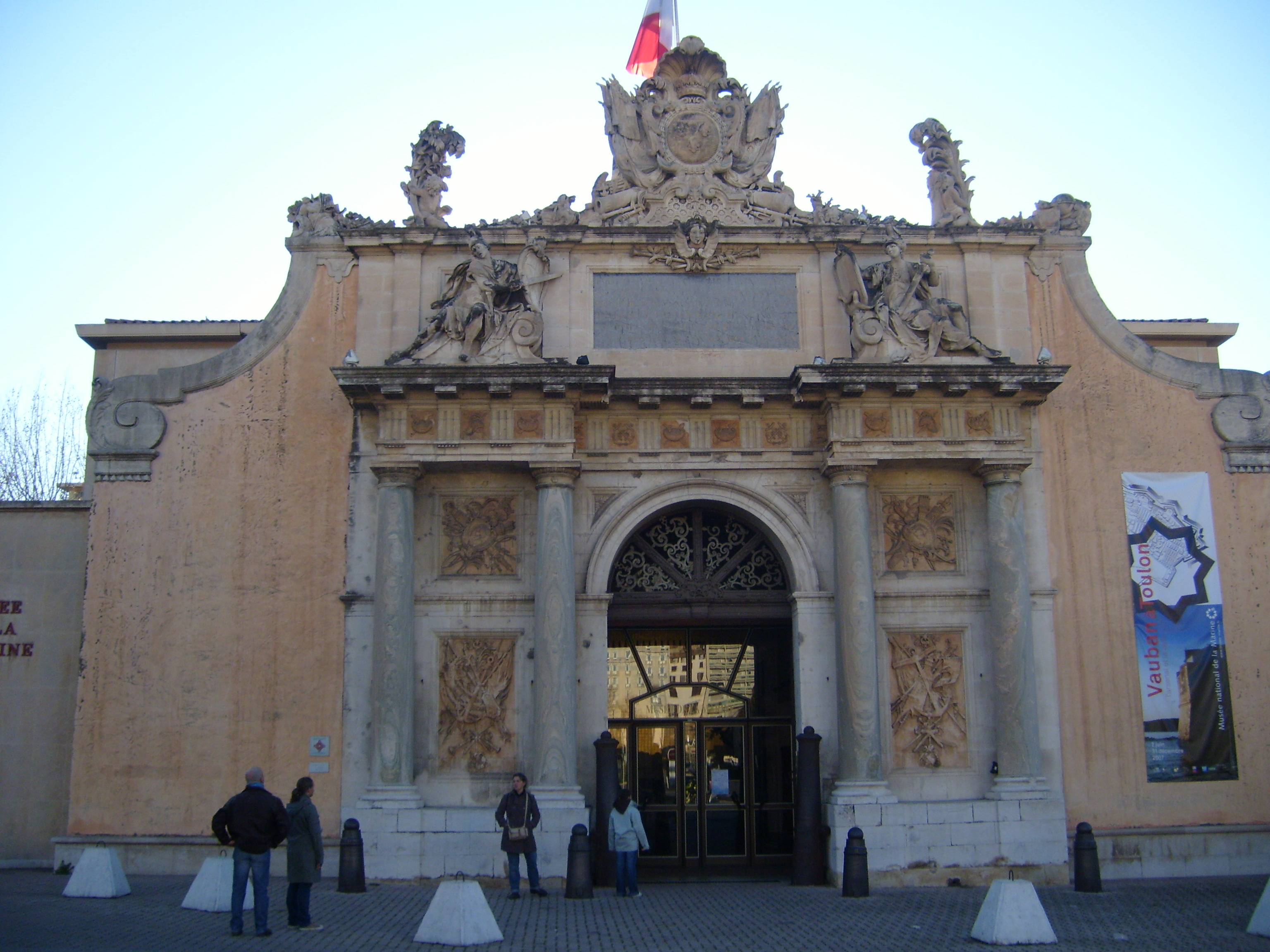
The Triumphal Entrance of the Arsenal of Toulon (1738), now the Naval Museum

The military base is divided into four main zones, each with their own access to the sea. From east to west these are:

- Castigneau;
- Malbousquet;
- Missiessy;
- Milhaud.

The first has two main entrances:

- next to the civilian port - the main gate, adjoining the musée de la marine whose façade, classed as a monument historique, is the predecessor to this new gate. The new gate is located next to the arsenal's quai d'honneur and the monumental façade of the Mediterranean maritime préfecture, flanked by cannons and gilding.
- at the west entrance to Toulon town-centre - more practical than the other entrance (it is less than 200m from an autoroute exit onto four roads), it ensures freight and civil and military convoys from the base can flow freely.

The three other gates are secondary and little used, though still heavily guarded. To the extreme west in the communes of La Seyne-sur-Mer and Ollioules the military base is in contact with the commercial port of Brégaillon, connected to national and regional networks for the supply of artillery munitions and other supplies.

The arsenal du Mourillon, next to the roadstead, is directly accessible via the north arsenal which housed a submarine base until 1945. The south arsenal is accessed by the small slipway of Le Mourillon beside the now-disappeared torpedo factory.

=== Roads and railways ===
The military bases possesses more than 30 km of roads, railway level crossings, traffic lights, signs, etc.. It also has an SNCF rail line running from the station at La Seyne-sur-Mer to the docks via its storage sheds.

=== Naval installations ===
The naval installations of Toulon harbour are, from East to West:

The honour quay

Used to harbour foreign ships, or large ships. Traditionally, this quay was used to honour distinguished ships by putting them into view from the merchant harbour.

The four dry docks and the Vauban dock

The four dry docks are fit for repairs on medium to large craft. The Vaudan dock is used as a mooring for small ships (diver support, mine warfare, tugs, patrol boats) and elder ships.

Missiessy quay and Malbousquet quay

Harbour the nuclear attack submarines. The quays are fitted with mobile roofs that cover the submarines when their nuclear equipment is being refitted. These quays also comprise a number of dry docks.

Milhaud quays

The main mooring stations of the harbour, where frigates, aircraft carriers, fleet tankers and landing ships are stationed.

== See also ==
- Fort de Balaguier
