= Gaston Romazzotti =

French naval engineer (1855–1915)

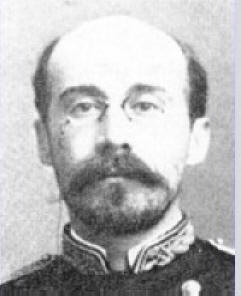
- Born: 26 July 1855; Molsheim, Bas-Rhin, French Empire
- Died: 18 September 1915 (aged 60); Paris, French Republic
- Occupation: Naval architect

Gaston Romazzotti (26 July 1855 – 18 September 1915) was a French naval engineer of the late 19th and early 20th century, and an early designer of submarines.

== Early life ==
Romazzotti was born at Molsheim, in Bas-Rhin, in July 1855. After studying at the École Polytechnique and qualified as a marine engineer before starting work at the Toulon Naval Yard in southern France.

== Career ==
At Toulon Romazzotti worked with Henri Dupuy de Lôme and Gustave Zédé, both pioneers in submarine design, on the Gymnote, one of the world's first all-electric submarines and the first functional submarine to be equipped with torpedoes. In 1897 he was appointed director of the Cherbourg Naval Yard, where Zédé had been working on Sirène, completing her after Zédé's death and seeing her renamed Gustave Zédé in the late engineer's honour. That same year he started work on Morse, a submarine of his own design, intended to combine the best features of both previous vessels. This was followed in 1900 with two more vessels, Français and Algérien, which are referred to as the Morse class. In 1903 he oversaw the construction of the Naïade class of submarines, a set of 24 vessels built over a two-year period at Cherbourg. Romazzotti favoured a single-hulled form, as opposed to the double-hulled submersible pioneered in France by Maxime Laubeuf, which brought the two men into conflict. Romazzotti also used a copper alloy of his own devising, called Roma-bronze, which was intended to give a submarine's hull more flexibility than an all-steel hull, and which would interfere less with the use of a magnetic compass.

In 1912 Romazzotti became director of the Brest Arsenal, then central director at the Ministry of Marine, and was inspector-general of marine engineering in 1914.

Romazzotti died in Paris in September 1915, aged 60 years.

== Recognition ==
- Romazzotti was made a Chevalier ("knight") of the Legion of Honour.
- In 1918 a Lagrange-class submarine, Romazotti (Q114), was named after him.
- In Molsheim a street was named after him until 1961, when it was renamed "Rue des Lilas".
