= List of ship launches in 1913 =

The list of ship launches in 1913 is a chronological list of ships launched in 1913. In cases where no official launching ceremony was held, the date built or completed may be used instead.

Date	Country	Builder	Location	Ship	Class	Notes
3 January	Spain	SECN	Cartagena	Bustamante	Bustamante-class destroyer	For Spanish Navy
7 January	United Kingdom	Hawthorn Leslie and Company	Newcastle upon Tyne	Contest	Acasta-class destroyer	For Royal Navy
11 January	Germany	Schichau-Werke	Elbing	S21	V1-class torpedo boat	For Imperial German Navy.
22 January	United Kingdom	Armstrong Whitworth	Newcastle upon Tyne	Rio de Janeiro	Dreadnought battleship	For Brazilian Navy
25 January	United Kingdom	John Brown & Company	Clydebank	Ambuscade	Acasta-class destroyer	For Royal Navy
28 January	Germany			Phönix	Cargo ship	For Dampfschifffahrtsgesellschaft Argo AG
8 February	United States	William Cramp & Sons	Philadelphia, Pennsylvania	Parker	Aylwin-class destroyer	For United States Navy
15 February	Germany	Schichau-Werke	Elbing	S22	V1-class torpedo boat	For Imperial German Navy.
20 February	United Kingdom	Blyth Shipbuilding & Dry Docks Co. Ltd	Blyth	Dilston	Cargo ship	For Tyneside Line Ltd.
28 February	Germany	AG Vulcan	Stettin	V6	V1-class torpedo boat	For Imperial German Navy.
1 March	Germany	Königliche Werft	Wilhelmshaven	König	König-class battleship	For Imperial German Navy
22 March	United States	William Cramp & Sons	Philadelphia, Pennsylvania	Benham	Aylwin-class destroyer	For United States Navy
22 March	France	Arsenal de Cherbourg	Cherbourg	Franklin	Brumaire-class submarine	For French Navy
26 March	France	Forges et Chantiers de la Méditerranée	La Seyne	Gallia	—	For: Cie. de Navigation Sud Atlantique
29 March	Germany	Schichau-Werke	Elbing	S23	V1-class torpedo boat	For Imperial German Navy.
30 March	Italy	La Spezia Naval Base	La Spezia	Andrea Doria	Andrea Doria-class battleship	For Regia Marina
3 April	Germany	Blohm & Voss	Hamburg	Vaterland	Imperator-class ocean liner	For Hamburg America Line
5 April	United States	Fore River Shipyard	Quincy, Massachusetts	Duncan	Cassin-class destroyer	For United States Navy
8 April	Germany	Joh. C. Tecklenborg	Bremerhaven	Solfels	Cargo ship	
8 April	United Kingdom	Cammell Laird & Co. Ltd	Birkenhead	Bergensfjord	Ocean liner	For Norwegian America Line
12 April	United Kingdom	Harland & Wolff	Belfast	Katoomba	Passenger ship	For McIlwraith & McEachern & Co.
18 April	United Kingdom	Royal Navy Dockyard	Pembroke Dock	Nottingham	Town-class cruiser	For Royal Navy
19 April	France	Forges et Chantiers de la Méditerranée	La Seyne	Lagane	Steam ferry	For: Soc. des bateaux à vapeur La Seyne-Toulon
19 April	United Kingdom	Fairfield Shipbuilding and Engineering Company, Limited	Govan	Calgarian	Ocean liner	For Allan Line Steamship Company Ltd.
20 April	France	Arsenal de Lorient	Lorient	Provence	Bretagne-class battleship	For French Navy
21 April	France	Brest Arsenal	Brest	Bretagne	Bretagne-class battleship	For French Navy
21 April	United Kingdom	John Brown & Company	Clydebank	Aquitania	Ocean liner	
22 April	United Kingdom	Blyth Shipbuilding & Dry Docks Co. Ltd	Blyth	Ridley	Cargo ship	For Ref 'R' Steamship Co. Ltd.
24 April	Italy	Royal Dockyard	Castellammare di Stabia	Duilio	Andrea Doria-class battleship	For Regia Marina
24 April	France	Forges et Chantiers de la Méditerranée	Le Havre	Ango	—	For: Cie. Française de Navigation à Vapeur Chargeurs Réunis
25 April	Germany	AG Vulcan	Stettin	V5	V1-class torpedo boat	For Imperial German Navy.
28 April	United Kingdom	Chatham Dockyard	Chatham	Lowestoft	Town-class cruiser	For Royal Navy
5 May	Germany	Vulcan-Werke	Stettin	Grosser Kurfürst	König-class battleship	For Imperial German Navy
7 May	Spain	Sociedad Española de Construcción Naval	Ferrol	Alfonso XIII	España-class battleship	For Spanish Navy.
7 May	United Kingdom	Armstrong Whitworth	Newcastle upon Tyne	Birmingham	Town-class cruiser	For Royal Navy
8 May	United Kingdom	Harland & Wolff	Belfast	Andes	Passenger ship	For Pacific Steam Navigation Company.
20 May	France	Arsenal de Cherbourg	Cherbourg	Gustave Zédé	Submarine	For French Navy
20 May	United States	Bath Iron Works	Bath, Maine	Cassin	Cassin-class destroyer	For United States Navy
20 May	France	Chantiers et Ateliers de Saint‑Nazaire–Penhoët	Le Grand-Quevilly	Puerto Rico	Cargo ship	For Cie. Générale Transatlantique
22 May	United Kingdom	Vickers Shipbuilding and Engineering	Barrow-in-Furness	AE1	E-class submarine	For Royal Navy
27 May	Norway	Karljohansvern	Horten	Garm	Draug-class destroyer	For Royal Norwegian Navy
4 June	Germany	AG Weser	Bremen	Markgraf	König-class battleship	For Imperial German Navy
7 June	France	Forges et Chantiers de la Méditerranée	La Seyne	Lynx	Pilot boat	For: Cie. Universelle du Canal Maritime de Suez
18 June	United Kingdom	Vickers Shipbuilding and Engineering	Barrow-in-Furness	AE2	E-class submarine	For Royal Navy
28 June	United Kingdom	Blyth Shipbuilding & Dry Docks Co. Ltd	Blyth	Borgland	type	For A/S Borga.
28 June	Germany	Schichau-Werke	Elbing	S24	V1-class torpedo boat	For Imperial German Navy.
10 July	United Kingdom	Harland & Wolff	Govan	Attendant	Passenger tender	For Elder Dempster Lines
17 July	Germany	Blohm & Voss	Hamburg	Derfflinger	Derfflinger-class battlecruiser	For Imperial German Navy
5 August	France	Ateliers et Chantiers de la Loire	Nantes	Champlain	Mixed cargo ship	For Cie.des Chargeurs Réunis
6 August	United States	Bath Iron Works	Bath, Maine	Cummings	Cassin-class destroyer	For United States Navy
20 August	United Kingdom	Blyth Shipbuilding & Dry Docks Co. Ltd	Blyth	Bywell	Collier	For Screw Collier Co. Ltd.
2 September	France	Forges et Chantiers de la Méditerranée	Le Havre	Drague VI	Dredger	For Ponts et Chaussées (Bordeaux)
3 September	United Kingdom	Vickers Shipbuilding and Engineering	Barrow-in-Furness	Reşadiye	Reşadiye-class battleship	For Ottoman Navy
4 September	United Kingdom	Harland & Wolff	Belfast	Maryland	Passenger ship	For Atlantic Transport Co.
7 September	France	Chantiers et ateliers de Provence	Port-de-Bouc	Haiti	Ocean liner	For Cie, Générale Transatlantique
30 September	France	Forges et Chantiers de la Méditerranée	Le Havre	Bougainville	—	For: Cie Francaise de Nav a Vapeur Chargeurs Reunis
30 September	France	Ateliers et Chantiers de la Loire	Saint-Nazaire	Lorraine	Bretagne-class battleship	For French Navy
2 October	United Kingdom	Harland & Wolff	Belfast	Orduna	Passenger ship	For Pacific Steam Navigation Company.
2 October	France	Arsenal de Rochefort	Rochefort	Clorinde	Clorinde-class submarine	For French Navy
16 October	United Kingdom	Portsmouth Royal Dockyard	Portsmouth	Queen Elizabeth	Queen Elizabeth-class battleship	For Royal Navy
25 October	Germany	Kaiserliche Werft	Kiel	Graudenz	Graudenz-class cruiser	For Imperial German Navy
29 October	France	Arsenal de Rochefort	Rochefort	Cornélie	Clorinde-class submarine	For French Navy
30 October	United Kingdom	Harland & Wolff	Belfast	Alcantara	Passenger ship	For Royal Mail Line
30 October	United Kingdom	Blyth Shipbuilding & Dry Docks Co. Ltd	Blyth	Ryton	Cargo ship	For Red 'R' Steamship Co. Ltd.
1 November	United States	Newport News Shipbuilding	Newport News, Virginia	Manoa	Steamship	For Matson Line
8 November	United States	New York Shipbuilding Corporation	Camden, New Jersey	Downes	Cassin-class destroyer	For United States Navy
11 November	France	Forges et Chantiers de la Méditerranée	La Seyne	Patria	Steel, twin-screw, schooner-rigged steamer	For: Cie. Française de Navigation à Vapeur
12 November	United Kingdom	William Beardmore and Company	Glasgow	Benbow	Iron Duke-class battleship	For Royal Navy
26 November	United Kingdom	Plymouth Dockyard	Plymouth	Warspite	Queen Elizabeth-class battleship	For Royal Navy
27 November	United Kingdom	Vickers Shipbuilding and Engineering	Barrow-in-Furness	Emperor of India	Iron Duke-class battleship	For Royal Navy
27 November	United Kingdom	Harland & Wolff	Belfast	Missouri	Passenger ship	For Atlantic Transport Co.
29 November	France	Forges et Chantiers de la Méditerranée	Le Havre	Edouard Jéramec	—	For: Cie. Français des Cables Télégraphiques
29 November	Germany	Schichau-Werke	Danzig	Lützow	Derfflinger-class battlecruiser	For Imperial German Navy
10 December	Spain	SECN	Cartagena	Villaamil	Bustamante-class destroyer	For Spanish Navy
14 December	United Kingdom	Blyth Shipbuilding & Dry Docks Co. Ltd	Blyth	Elsdon	Cargo ship	For Sharp Steamship Co. Ltd.
15 December	United Kingdom	John Brown & Company	Clydebank	Tiger	Tiger-class battlecruiser	For Royal Navy
15 December	United Kingdom	Barclay Curle	Glasgow	Bandra	Cargo liner	For British India Steam Navigation Company.
17 December	United Kingdom	Harland & Wolff	Belfast	Egba	Cargo ship	For Elder Dempster.
29 December	United Kingdom	Parsons Marine Steam Turbine Company / Hawthorn Leslie	Wallsend / Hebburn	Lucifer	Laforey-class destroyer	For Royal Navy
Unknown date	United States			A. Brook Taylor	Fishing trawler	For Virginia Fishing Co.
Unknown date	United States	New York Launch & Engine Building Co.	Morris Heights, New York	Abalone	Motorboat	For Arnold Schlaet.
Unknown date	United Kingdom	I. J. Abdela & Mitchell Ltd.	Queensferry	Anchovy	Barge	For Rea Transportation Co. Ltd.
Unknown date	United Kingdom	Beeching Brothers Ltd.	Great Yarmouth	Arthur H. Johnson	Steam drifter	For Great Yarmouth Steam Drifters Ltd.
Unknown date	United Kingdom	I. J. Abdela & Mitchell Ltd.	Queensferry	Bonanza	Steamship	For private owner.
Unknown date	United Kingdom	Beeching Brothers Ltd.	Great Yarmouth	Boy Charles	Steam drifter	For Charles A. Webster.
Unknown date	United Kingdom	I. J. Abdela & Mitchell Ltd.	Queensferry	Carita	Coaster	For John Summers & Sons Ltd.
Unknown date	United Kingdom			Desabla	Oil tanker	
Unknown date	United Kingdom	I. J. Abdela & Mitchell Ltd.	Queensferry	Fleurita	Coaster	For John Summers & Sons Ltd.
Unknown date	United Kingdom	I. J. Abdela & Mitchell Ltd.	Queensferry	Haddock	Barge	For Rea Transportation Co. Ltd.
Unknown date	United Kingdom	I. J. Abdela & Mitchell Ltd.	Queensferry	Hake	Barge	For Rea Transportation Co. Ltd.
Unknown date	United Kingdom	Beeching Brothers Ltd.	Great Yarmouth	J Burn	Steam drifter	For Robert Milburn.
Unknown date	United Kingdom	Beeching Brothers Ltd.	Great Yarmouth	Ocean Favourite	Steam drifter	For Bloomfields Ltd.
Unknown date	United Kingdom	Beeching Brothers Ltd.	Great Yarmouth	Ocean Harvest	Steam drifter	For Bloomfields Ltd.
Unknown date	United Kingdom	Beeching Brothers Ltd.	Great Yarmouth	Ocean Pilot	Steam drifter	For W. J. E. Green Ltd.
Unknown date	United Kingdom	I. J. Abdela & Mitchell Ltd.	Queensferry	Pater	Motor vessel	For The Barge Pirate Co. Ltd.
Unknown date	United Kingdom	I. J. Abdela & Mitchell Ltd.	Queensferry	Sardine	Barge	For Rea Transportation Co. Ltd.
Unknown date	Germany	Bremer Vulkan Schiff- und Maschinenbau.	Vegesack	Sierra Salvada	Passenger ship	For private owner.
Unknown date	United Kingdom	Beeching Brothers Ltd.	Great Yarmouth	The Throne	Steam drifter	For Crown Steam Drifters Ltd.
Unknown date	United Kingdom	I. J. Abdela & Mitchell Ltd.	Queensferry	Whelk	Barge	For Rea Transportation Co. Ltd.
Unknown date	United Kingdom	I. J. Abdela & Mitchell Ltd.	Queensferry	Whiting	Barge	For Rea Transportation Co. Ltd.
Unknown date	Germany	Reiherstieg Schiffswerft & Maschinenfabrik	Hamburg	Wotan	Tanker	For Deutsche-Amerikan Petroleum Gesellschaft
Unknown date	United Kingdom	Hall, Russell & Co. Ltd.	Aberdeen	Zealous	Dockyard tanker	For private owner.
Unknown date	United Kingdom	I. J. Abdela & Mitchell Ltd.	Queensferry	3 G.W.R.	Barge	For Great Western Railway.
Unknown date	United Kingdom	I. J. Abdela & Mitchell Ltd.	Queensferry	4 G.W.R.	Barge	For Great Western Railway.
Unknown date	United Kingdom	I. J. Abdela & Mitchell Ltd.	Queensferry	5 G.W.R.	Barge	For Great Western Railway.
Unknown date	United Kingdom	I. J. Abdela & Mitchell Ltd.	Queensferry	6 G.W.R.	Barge	For Great Western Railway.
Unknown date	United Kingdom	I. J. Abdela & Mitchell Ltd.	Queensferry	Unnamed	Pontoon	For private owner.
Unknown date	United Kingdom	I. J. Abdela & Mitchell Ltd.	Queensferry	Unnamed	Pontoon	For private owner.
Unknown date	United Kingdom	I. J. Abdela & Mitchell Ltd.	Queensferry	Unnamed	Motor vessel	For private owner.
Unknown date	United Kingdom	I. J. Abdela & Mitchell Ltd.	Queensferry	Unnamed	Motor vessel	For private owner.
Unknown date	United Kingdom	I. J. Abdela & Mitchell Ltd.	Queensferry	Unnamed	Motor vessel	For private owner.
Unknown date	United Kingdom	I. J. Abdela & Mitchell Ltd.	Queensferry	Unnamed	Motor vessel	For private owner.
Unknown date	United Kingdom	I. J. Abdela & Mitchell Ltd.	Queensferry	Unnamed	Steamship	For private owner.
