= Clorinde =

Clorinde may refer to:

- French ship Clorinde, various French Navy frigates and submarines
- Clorinde-class submarine, a French Navy class of two submarines completed in 1916 and 1917
- 282 Clorinde, an asteroid
- Clorinde, a character in the 2020 video game Genshin Impact

== See also ==
- Clorinda (disambiguation)
- Clarinda (disambiguation)
