= Nereide =

Nereide may refer to:

- Italian submarine Nereide
- Nereide (horse)
- Nereide (HBC vessel), operated by the HBC from 1833 to 1840, see Hudson's Bay Company vessels

== See also ==
- Nereid (disambiguation)
