= French ship Néréide =

Many ships of the French Navy have borne the name Néréide, after the Nereid (sea nymphs):

- Néréide (1690), a galley
- Néréide (1696), a 20-gun frigate
- French ship Néréide (1724), a 42-gun fourth rank, broken up in 1743.
- French frigate Néréide (1779), a 32-gun Sibylle-class frigate, captured in 1797 by HMS Phoebe off the Scilly Isles and taken into service as HMS Nereide. The French recaptured her in 1810 during the Battle of Grand Port; she was broken up after being badly damaged.
- French frigate Néréide (1808), a 44-gun frigate, captured in 1811 and taken into service as HMS Madagascar. She was struck from the Navy list in 1819.
- French frigate Néréide (1813), a 46-gun frigate which bore the name Rancune
- French frigate Néréide (1836), a 52-gun frigate
- French submarine Néréide, a Gustave Zédé-class submarine launched in 1914 and struck in 1935
