= Gustave Zédé =

French engineer

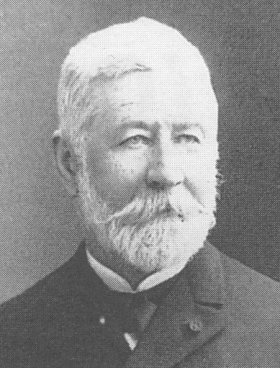
- Born: 15 February 1825; Paris
- Died: 26 April 1891 (aged 66); Paris
- Occupation: Naval architect

Gustave Zédé (1825–1891) was a French naval engineer and pioneering designer of submarines.

== Early life ==
He was born in Paris in February 1825. After studying at the École Polytechnique in November 1843 he qualified in 1845 as a marine engineer and went to work at the Brest Naval Dockyard.

== Career ==
By 1863 he was chief engineer in charge of shipbuilding under the direction of Henri Dupuy de Lôme, and under his leadership Zédé helped design and build Gymnote, the first practicable submarine, which was launched in 1880. In 1877 Zédé had become Director of Naval Construction, but in 1880 he left to be a director of the Société Nouvelle des Forges et Chantiers de la Méditerranée, a shipyard at Toulon.

In 1880 he started planning the construction of Sirène, a larger version of Gymnote and France's (and one of the world's) earliest commissioned naval submarines. Sirène was ordered by the French Navy in 1890, and launched in 1893. After Zédé's death the submarine was renamed in his honour.

Gustave Zédé died on 26 April 1891, from an explosion that occurred while he was testing the propulsion system for a new torpedo.

== Recognition ==
- In 1866 Zédé was made an Officier ("Officer") of the Legion of Honour
- The French Navy has named for four ships after Zédé; two submarines and two surface ships
- There are streets named for Zédé in Paris, Brest and Lanester, in Brittany

== See also ==
- Arthur Constantin Krebs
