= French ship Cornélie =

French ship Cornélie includes the following ships:

- French frigate Cornélie (1797), a Virginie-class frigate captured by the Spanish Navy in 1808
- French frigate Cornélie , an Armide-class frigate, capsized 1814, never launched
- French submarine Cornélie (Q91), a Clorinde-class submarine, launched 1913, scrapped 1927
- French submarine Cornélie (Q214), an Aurore-class submarine, never laid down
