= French ship Gustave Zédé =

Gustave Zédé may refer to the following ships of the French Navy:

- French submarine Gustave Zédé (1893), a submarine launched in 1893
- Gustave Zédé-class submarine, a pair of submarines built for the French Navy just before World War I
  - French submarine Gustave Zédé (1913), lead vessel of the class
- French submarine tender Gustave Zédé (A641), a submarine tender in commission from 1948 to 1971
- French research vessel Gustave Zédé, ex-Marcel Le Bihan, ex-Greif, renamed 1978 to 1990
