= Triton and Nereid =

Triton and Nereid may refer to:

Art

- Triton and Nereid (Sussmann-Hellborn), also known as Meeresidylle, painting by Louis Sussmann-Hellborn (missing since 1945)
- Triton and Nereid (Böcklin), also known as Meeresidylle, 1877 painting by Arnold Böcklin
- Triton and Nereid (Gauguin), painting by Jean René Gauguin
- Tritons and Nereids, 1500 painting by Piero di Cosimo

Other

- Triton and Nereid, two Moons of Neptune

== See also ==
- Triton (disambiguation)
- Nereid (disambiguation)
