= Nereid (disambiguation) =

A Nereid is a sea nymph in Greek mythology.

Nereid or Nereids may also refer to:

- Nereid (moon), the third-largest moon of Neptune
- Nereid (worm), a polychaete worm
- Nereids (organization), a fictional organization in the anime series Daphne in the Brilliant Blue
- The Nereids, a lost tragedy by the Greek playwright Aeschylus assigned by modern scholars to the trilogy the Achilleis
- Nereid Avenue (IRT White Plains Road Line), a station of the New York City Subway
- Nereid Avenue, a major street in the Wakefield section of The Bronx, New York City
- Nereid (Dungeons & Dragons), fey beings similar to nymphs and dryads

== See also ==
- French ship Néréide
- HMS Nereide
- Nereide (horse)
- Neriad Horseshoe Bat, a species of bat
- Nereida
- Nereidi, a sculpture in Helsinki, Finland
