= Clarinda =

Clarinda may refer to:

== People ==
- Clarinda (poet), Peruvian poet who wrote in the early 17th century
- Clarinda Sarah Parkes (1839–1915), pen name Menie Parkes, Australian poet and writer
- Clarinda Sinnige (born 1973), former field hockey goalkeeper from the Netherlands
- Clarinda Soriano, representative of the Philippines in the Miss Universe 1966 beauty pageant
- Clarinda or Rasa Clorinda (c. 1746–c. 1806), Indian Christian missionary and social worker in South India
- Clarinda, name given by Scottish poet Robert Burns to Agnes Maclehose (1758–1841)

== Fictional characters ==
- Clarinda, a major character in The Virtuoso, a play first produced in 1676
- Clarinda, a major character in The Lovers' Progress, an early 17th-century play
- Clarinda, in The Deserving Favourite, another early 17th-century play
- Clarinda, in the play The Sea Voyage, licensed for performance in 1622
- the title character of Clarinda, a 1948 novel by Vicki Baum, also published as Headless Angel

== Places ==
- Clarinda, Victoria, a suburb of the Australian city of Melbourne
- Electoral district of Clarinda, Melbourne
- Clarinda, Iowa, a city and county seat in the United States
  - Clarinda Correctional Facility
- Clarinda, Alberta, an unincorporated community in Canada

== Other uses ==
- USS Clarinda, a United States Navy patrol vessel/armed yacht in commission from 1917 to 1930
- Clarinda Antelopes, a former minor league baseball team based in Clarinda, Iowa

== See also ==
- Clorinda (disambiguation)
- Clorinde (disambiguation)
