= Clorinda =

Clorinda may refer to:

== People ==
- Clorinda Corradi (1804–1877), Italian opera contralto
- Linda Fiorentino (born 1958), American retired actress
- Clorinda Málaga de Prado (1905–1993), First Lady of Peru
- Clorinda Matto de Turner (1852–1909), Peruvian writer
- Clorinda Low Lucas (1895–1986), American Hawaiian social worker
- Clorinda S. Minor (1806–1855), American writer and expatriate in Palestine
- Clorinda Rosato (1913–1985), Brazilian composer, pianist and teacher
- Rasa Clorinda (c. 1746–c. 1806), sometimes known as simply Clorinda, Indian Christian missionary and church founder

== Fictional characters ==
- Clorinda (Jerusalem Delivered), in the 1581 epic poem Jerusalem Delivered by Torquato Tasso
- Clorinda, one of the protagonists in Il combattimento di Tancredi e Clorinda, a 1624 operatic scena based on Tasso
- Clorinda, a protagonist in the 1777 opera Il curioso indiscreto by Pasquale Anfossi
- Clorinda, in the 1817 opera La Cenerentola by Gioachino Rossini
- Clorinda, a main character in the 1863 one-act opérette Il signor Fagotto by Jacques Offenbach
- Clorinda, Robin Hood's bride in the 1716 ballad "Robin Hood's Birth, Breeding, Valor, and Marriage"
- Clorinda, in the 17th century play Cicilia and Clorinda by Thomas Killigrew
- Clorinda, in the 1933 novel Fontamara by Ignazio Silone

== Other uses ==
- Clorinda, Formosa, a city in Argentina
  - Clorinda Airport
- Clorinda (brachiopod), a brachiopod genus
- HMS Clorinda, a fictional Royal Navy ship in the novel Hornblower in the West Indies
- Clorinda, an 1811 portrait painting by Thomas Douglas Guest

== See also ==
- Clarinda (disambiguation)
- Clorinde (disambiguation)
