= Delaunay-Belleville =

French luxury automobile manufacturer (1903–1950)

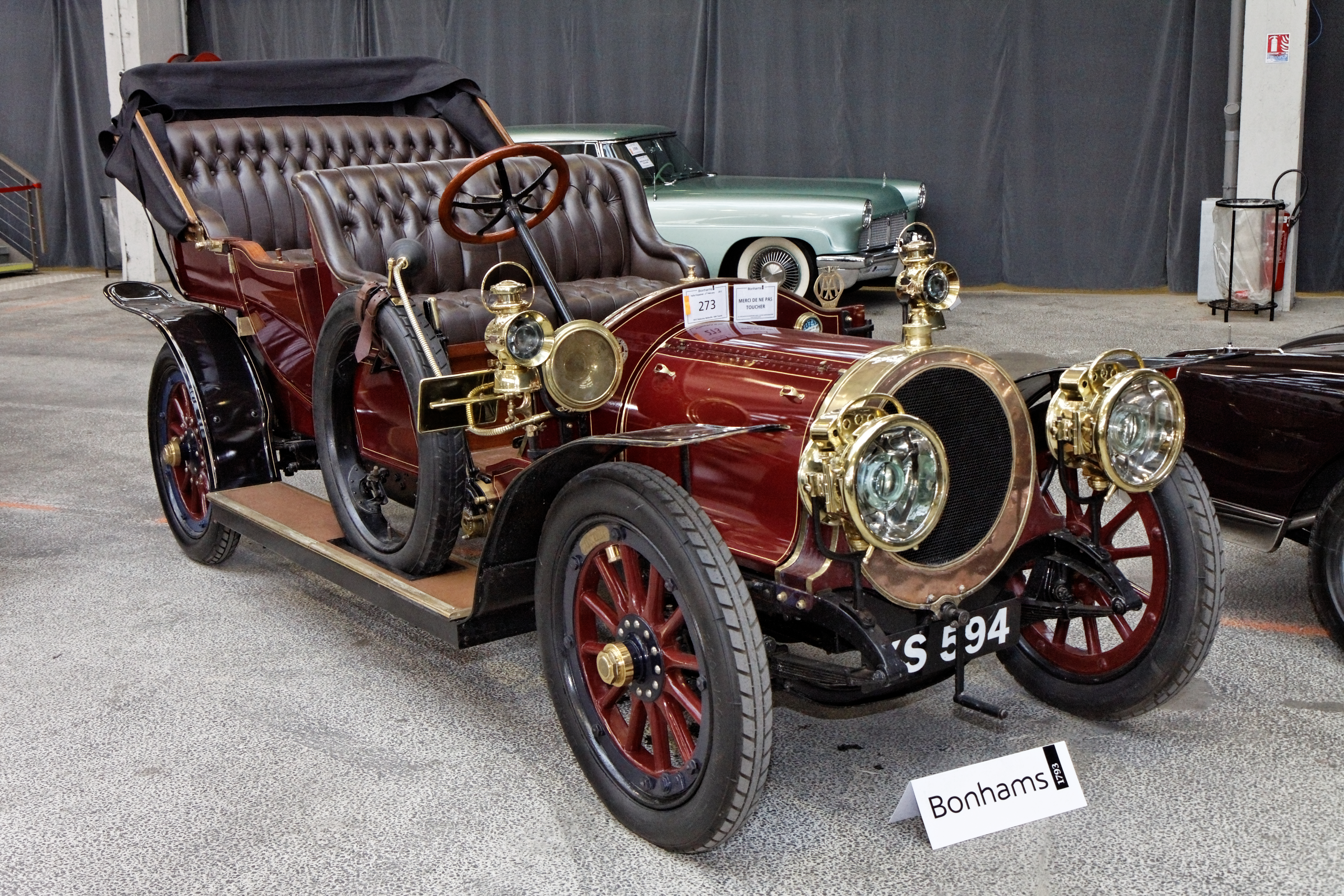
A 1911 Delaunay-Belleville HB 4 with replica coachwork

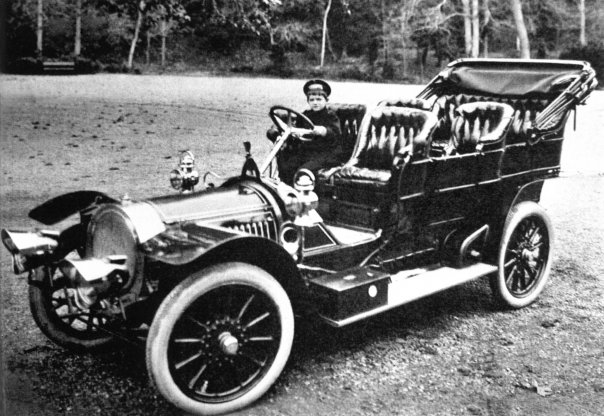
Alexei Nikolaevich, Tsarevich of Russia in 1909

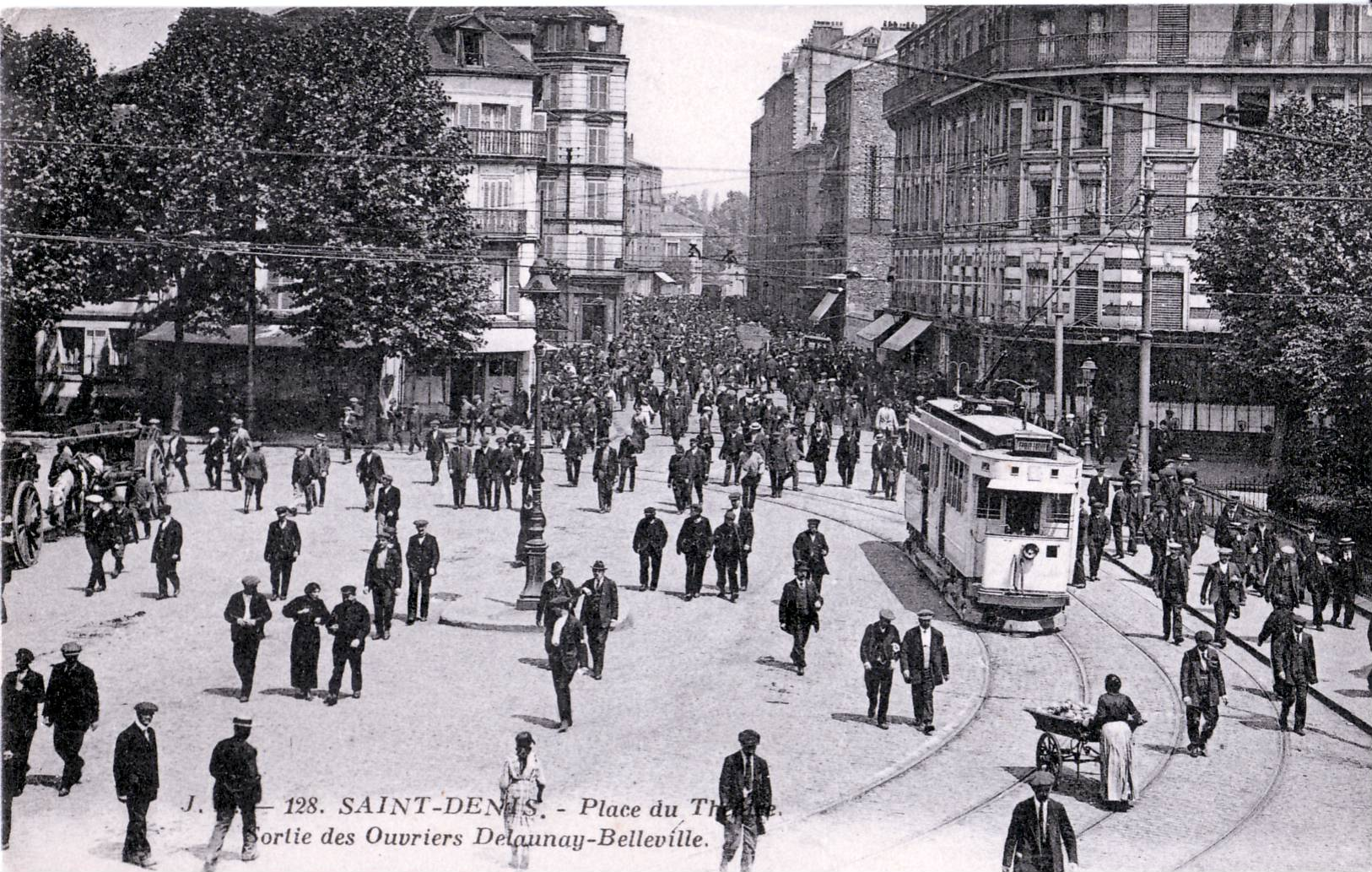
Workers leaving the Delaunay-Belleville plant early in the twentieth century

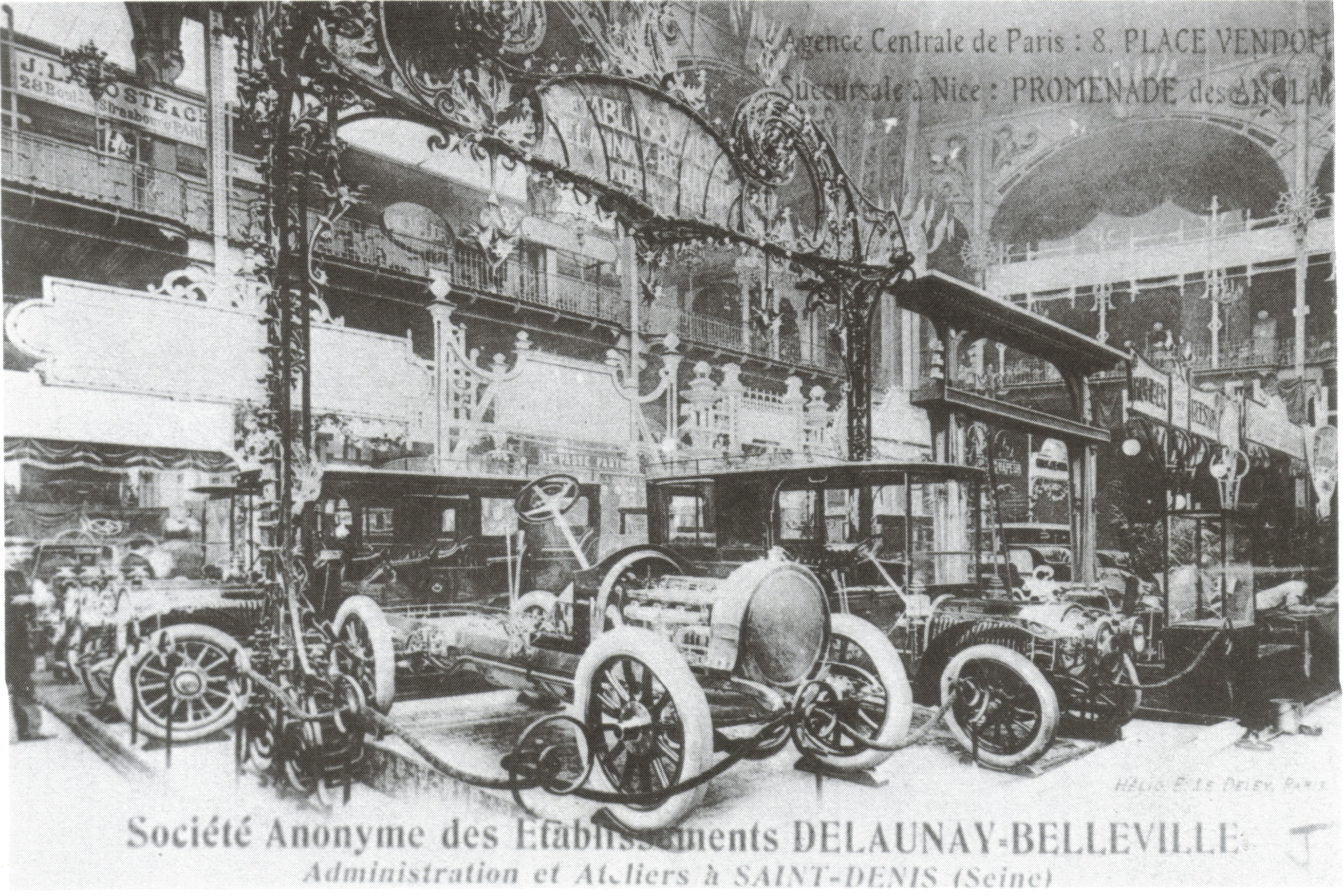
The Delaunay-Belleville factory at Saint-Denis

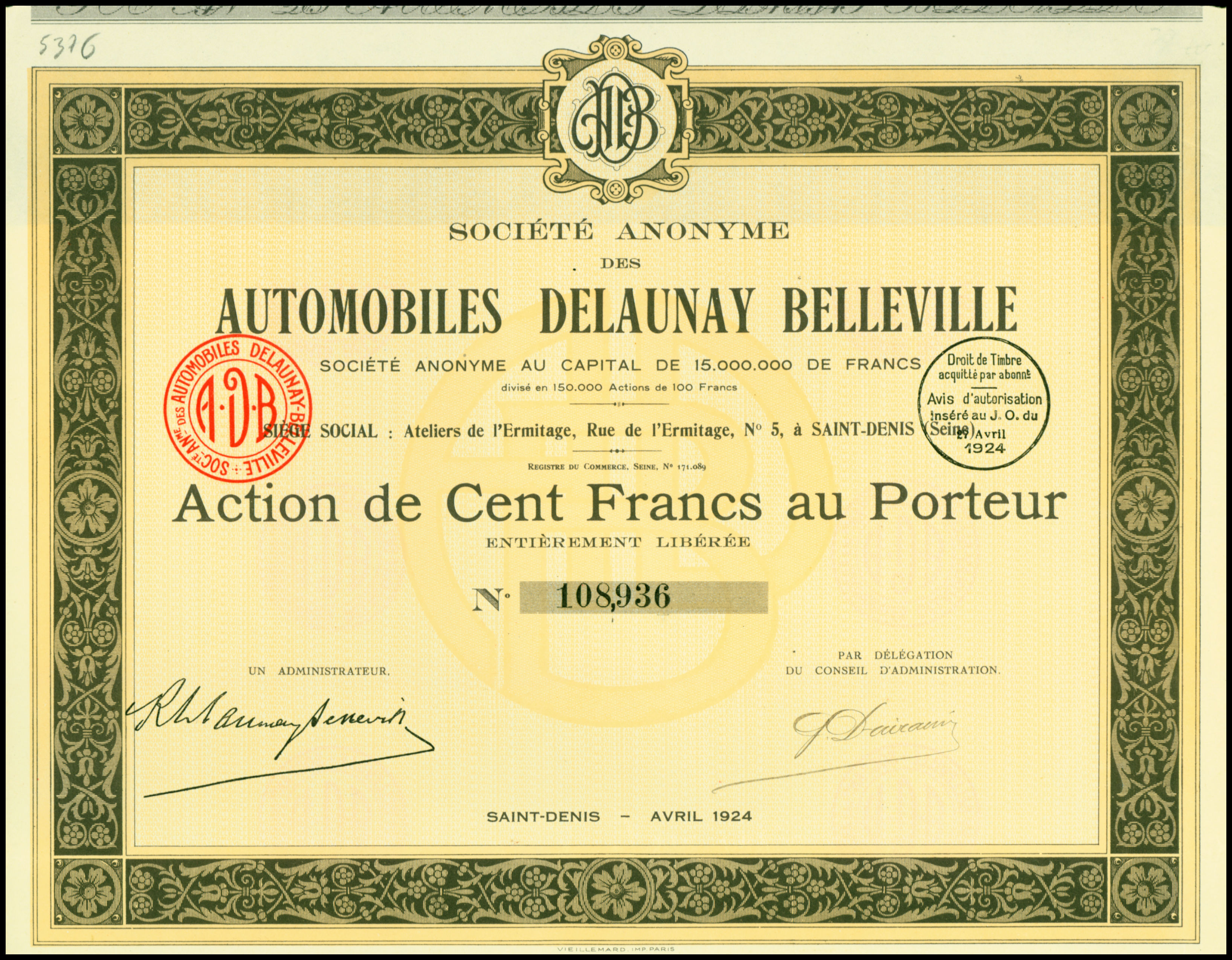
Share of the S. A. des Automobiles Delaunay Belleville, issued 29 April 1924

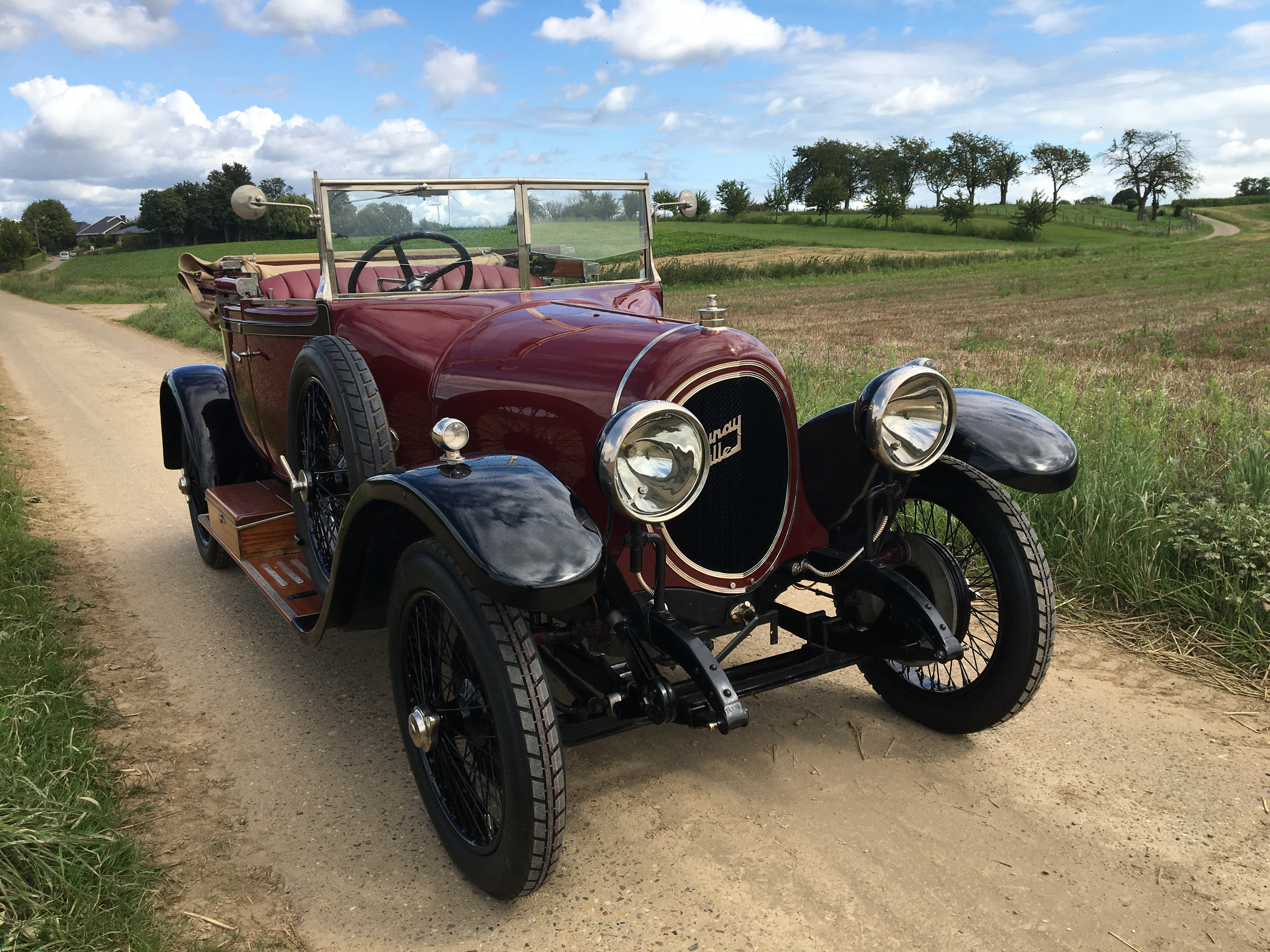
1924 Delaunay Belleville P4B, coachbuilder: Salmons & Sons

Automobiles Delaunay-Belleville (French pronunciation: [dəlonɛ bɛlvil]) was a French luxury automobile manufacturer at Saint-Denis, France, north of Paris. At the beginning of the 20th century they were among the most prestigious cars produced in the world, and perhaps the most desirable French marque.

== History ==
Julien Belleville had been a maker of marine boilers from around 1850. Louis Delaunay joined the firm in 1867 and married Belleville's daughter. He changed his name to Delaunay-Belleville and succeeded his father-in-law in charge of the company.

S.A. des Automobiles Delaunay-Belleville was formed in 1903 by Louis Delaunay and Marius Barbarou. Barbarou's family owned the boiler making company Belleville in Saint-Denis, with boiler design influences inspired by the company. Barbarou, then 28, had experience working for Clément, Lorraine-Dietrich and Benz and was responsible for design and styling, including the trademark round grille shell. The first car was exhibited at the 1904 Paris Salon, and it received enormous acclaim.

The company started with three models, all four-cylinders: a live axled 16 hp and a 24 hp and 40 hp model, both chain-driven. These were likely the first automobiles to have pressure-lubricated camshafts. The bodies were attached with just four bolts, and the brakes were water-cooled, from a 2 imp gal (9.1 L; 2.4 US gal) reservoir.

Delaunay-Belleville were a prestige marque, and one of the world's leaders, from the outset, and by 1906, Emperor Nicholas II of Russia had purchased a 40. Other royal owners included King George I of Greece and King Alfonso XIII of Spain.

The first French car maker to offer a six-cylinder engine, Delaunay-Belleville's 70 hp became available only in 1909, and then only in small numbers, remaining in limited production until 1912. This model came to be known as the Type SMT, or Sa Majesté le Tsar, because Nicholas purchased one of the last 70s built. He also ordered another in 1909; the demand for a silent starter, operable from the driving seat, became known as a Barbey starter, and was made standard at the end of 1910.

Like most prestige marques, the cars were sold as bare chassis and bodies were coachbuilt for them. Between 1906 and 1914, British imports were mainly bodied by Shinnie Brothers, a Burlington Coachbuilders subsidiary, in Aberdeen, then shipped to London for sale.

During the First World War, the Delaunay-Belleville armoured car was a British armoured car built on the chassis of the luxury French Delaunay-Belleville tourer. It saw service with the Royal Naval Air Service in the early years of the war.

Postwar, Continental bodies gained popularity, at least in Britain, as Belgium's D'Ieteren Frères became most associated with the company: their landaulette, on a 26 hp chassis, was priced in Britain at £900, pitting them between Napier and Rolls-Royce.

In 1919, the company offered the P4, a 2 litre sidevalve 10 hp four-cylinder, undoubtedly the most expensive voiturette on the market, as well as a 2.6 litre OHC 15.9 hp four, the P4B, in 1922.

After Barbarou resigned, Delaunay-Belleville quality began to slip. New four-cylinder pushrod overhead valve 14/40 and 16/60 models appeared in 1926, and the pre-war 20 hp and 10 hp six-cylinder models continued to be produced until 1927. The last gasps were the 3,180 cc (194 cu in) 21 hp six of 1928 and the 3,619 cc (220.8 cu in) 21/75 OHV six of 1930. In 1931, Continental engines, imported from the US, were offered, being quieter and cheaper.

By the late 1920s, Delaunay-Belleville had lost its prestige, and converted to truck and military vehicle production. In 1936 the previously separate car company was merged with the Delaunay-Belleville parent. Production of the Delaunay-Belleville RI-6 continued through the late 1930s and was revived after the Second World War. This was a six-cylinder-engined car strongly resembling the Mercedes-Benz 230, featuring independent suspension all-round; revived postwar, it featured Cotal preselector gearbox and a front grille design apparently copied from the 1939 Buick. However, the business was in decline: anyone buying a RI-6 in the 1940s would have done so in the knowledge after-sales service might disappear soon. Six cars were completed in 1947 and only four during the first part of 1948.

The company continued to advertise new cars for sale until 1950, but the factory was sold to Robert de Rovin in 1948 and thereafter used to make cyclecars.

== See also ==
- Delage – 1905-1953 French automotive brand manufacturer
- Delahaye – Defunct French manufacturing company
