= French ship Clorinde =

Five ships of the French navy have borne the name Clorinde, in honour of Clorinda in Jerusalem Delivered.

== Ships named Clorinde ==
- Clorinde (1800), a 44-gun Uranie-class frigate.
- Clorinde (1808), a 44-gun frigate.
- Clorinde (1821), a 52-gun frigate.
- Clorinde (1837), a frigate started in Brest but never completed.
- Clorinde (1845), a sail and steam frigate.
- Clorinde, a submarine launched in 1913 and stricken in 1927
- Clorinde (Q213), an unfinished French Navy submarine broken up in 1940
Ships of the French Navy named Clorinde
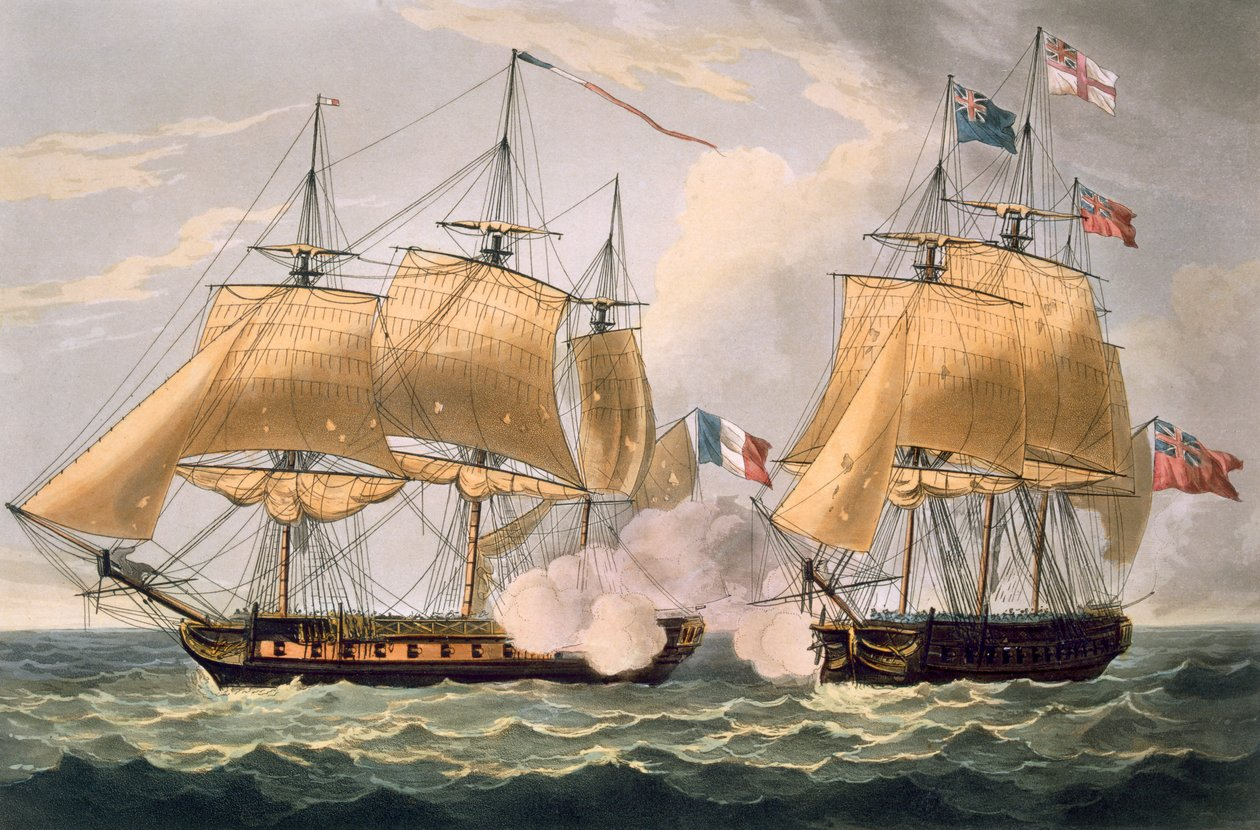
Clorinde (1808) fighting HMS Eurotas

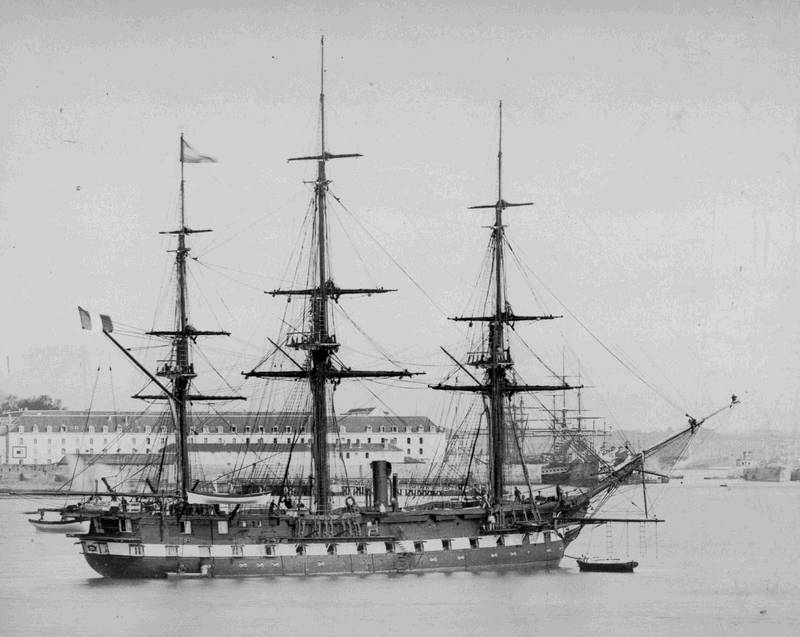
Photographic portrait of Clorinde (1845)

== See also ==
- HMS Clorinda

== Notes and references ==
=== Bibliography ===
- Roche, Jean-Michel (2005). Dictionnaire des bâtiments de la flotte de guerre française de Colbert à nos jours. Vol. 1. Group Retozel-Maury Millau. p. 118. ISBN 978-2-9525917-0-6. OCLC 165892922.
- Roche, Jean-Michel (2005). Dictionnaire des bâtiments de la flotte de guerre française de Colbert à nos jours. Vol. 2. Group Retozel-Maury Millau. p. 250. ISBN 978-2-9525917-0-6. OCLC 165892922.
