= Gustave Zédé-class submarine =

French Navy submarine from World War 1

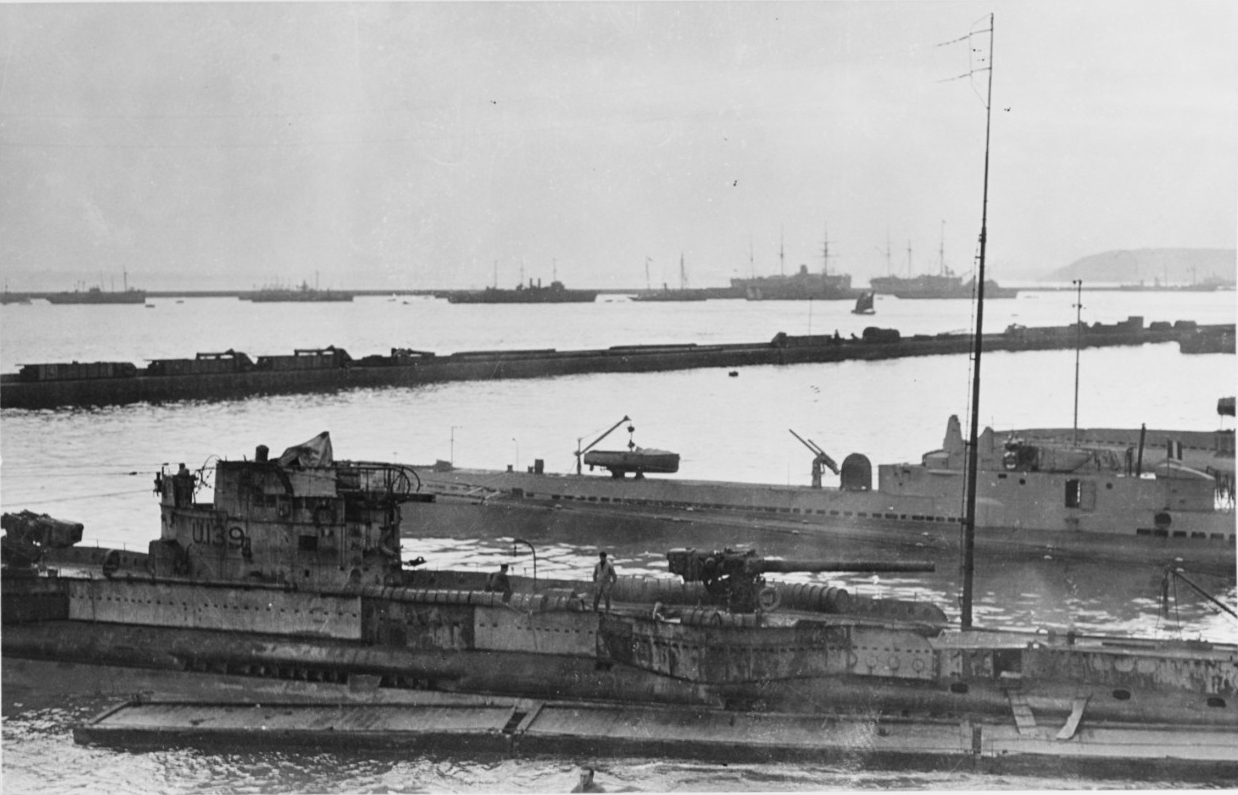
- A Gustave Zédé-class submarine in the background behind the ex-German SMS U-139 in French service as Halbronn, Brest, France, February 1919

Class overview
- Name: Gustave Zédé
- Builders: Arsenal de Cherbourg
- Operators: French Navy
- Preceded by: Clorinde class
- Succeeded by: Amphitrite class
- Built: 1911–16
- In commission: 1914–37
- Completed: 2
- Scrapped: 2

General characteristics (as built)
- Type: Submarine
- Displacement: 850 t (837 long tons) (surfaced); 1,048–1,099 t (1,031–1,082 long tons) (submerged)
- Length: 74 m (242 ft 9 in) (o/a)
- Beam: 6 m (19 ft 8 in) (deep)
- Draft: 4.1–4.2 m (13 ft 5 in – 13 ft 9 in)
- Installed power: 1,640 PS (1,210 kW; 1,620 bhp) (electric motors); 3,500 PS (2,600 kW; 3,500 bhp) (Du Temple boilers) or; 2,400 PS (1,800 kW; 2,400 bhp) (diesels)
- Propulsion: 2 × shafts; 2 × electric motors; 2 × Diesel engines or; 2 × triple-expansion steam engines
- Speed: 16 knots (30 km/h; 18 mph) (surfaced); 10–11 knots (19–20 km/h; 12–13 mph) (submerged)
- Complement: 43
- Armament: 2 × 450 mm (17.7 in) bow torpedo tubes; 6 × single external 450 mm torpedo launchers; 1 × 75 mm (3 in) deck gun (Néréide only)

The Gustave Zédé class consisted of a pair of submarines, Gustave Zédéand Néréide, built for the French Navy just before World War I. Both boats were intended to use diesel engines, but those ordered for Gustave Zédé were cancelled and steam engines substituted while she was under construction.

== Design and description ==
The Gustave Zédé class was built as part of the French Navy's 1909 building program to satisfy an ambitious requirement for a "high-seas" (sous-marin de haute mer) submarine capable of a speed of 20 knots (37 km/h; 23 mph) on the surface. To reach this speed the sisters were to use a pair of 2,400-metric-horsepower (2,367 bhp; 1,765 kW) two-cycle diesel engines. The engines for Gustave Zédé were to be a licensed design by MAN that was going to be built by Ateliers et Chantiers de la Loire, but MAN declared that it could not provide blueprints for such powerful engines and the contract was cancelled. The navy decided to use instead readily available Delaunay-Belleville vertical triple-expansion steam engines in 1912. Néréide retained her diesels, which meant that the sisters' performance differed significantly.

The boats had an overall length of 74 meters (242 ft 9 in), a beam of 6 meters (19 ft 8 in), and a draft of 4.1–4.2 meters (13 ft 5 in – 13 ft 9 in). Both displaced 850 metric tons (840 long tons) on the surface. Néréide displaced 1,088 t (1,071 long tons) submerged while Gustave Zédé displaced 1,099 t (1,082 long tons) underwater. The crew of both boats numbered 43 officers and crewmen.

Gustave Zédé's three-cylinder steam engines each drove one propeller shaft and were designed to produce a total of 4,000 ihp (4,055 PS; 2,983 kW) using steam from two du Temple boilers, but could only produce 3,500 ihp (3,549 PS; 2,610 kW). Néréide's diesels were intended to produce a total of 4,800 PS (4,734 bhp; 3,530 kW), but only produced half that. These shortfalls limited the sister to 16 knots (30 km/h; 18 mph) in service. When submerged each shaft was driven by a 820-metric-horsepower (809 bhp; 603 kW) electric motor. The designed speed underwater was 11 knots (20 km/h; 13 mph); on their sea trials Gustave Zédé reached 11.44 knots (21.19 km/h; 13.16 mph) while Néréide made 10.5 knots (19.4 km/h; 12.1 mph). The latter boat demonstrated a maximum surfaced range of 2,700 nautical miles (5,000 km; 3,100 mi) at 14.2 knots (26.3 km/h; 16.3 mph) and a submerged endurance was 359 nmi (665 km; 413 mi) at 2.8 knots (5.2 km/h; 3.2 mph). Equivalent figures for Gustave Zédé were 1,242 nmi (2,300 km; 1,429 mi) at 13.4 knots (24.8 km/h; 15.4 mph) and 135 nmi (250 km; 155 mi) at 5 knots (9.3 km/h; 5.8 mph).

The sisters were armed with a total of eight 450-millimeter (17.7 in) torpedoes, although they were distributed slightly differently. Gustave Zédé had two fixed internal torpedo tubes in the bow. The other six were located in external rotating torpedo launchers, three on each broadside that could traverse 160–165 degrees to the side of the boats. The boat was not initially fitted with a deck gun. Néréide shared the internal tubes, but substituted a pair of fixed tubes for the forward rotating mounts. She was equipped with a 75 mm (3 in) deck gun forward of the conning tower.

== Ships ==
Ships
Ship	Launched	Completed
Gustave Zédé (Q92)	20 May 1913	10 October 1914
Néréide (Q93)	9 May 1914	31 October 1916

== Bibliography ==
- Couhat, Jean Labayle (1974). French Warships of World War I. London: Ian Allan. ISBN 0-7110-0445-5.
- Garier, Gérard (2002). A l'épreuve de la Grande Guerre. L'odyssée technique et humaine du sous-marin en France (in French). Vol. 3–2. Bourg-en-Bresse, France: Marines édition. ISBN 2-909675-81-5.
- Garier, Gérard (2000). Des Clorinde (1912-1916) aux Diane (1912–1917). L'odyssée technique et humaine du sous-marin en France (in French). Vol. 3–1. Bourg-en-Bresse, France: Marines édition. ISBN 2-909675-54-8.
- Roberts, Stephen S. (2021). French Warships in the Age of Steam 1859–1914: Design, Construction, Careers and Fates. Barnsley, UK: Seaforth Publishing. ISBN 978-1-5267-4533-0.
- Roche, Jean-Michel (2005). Dictionnaire des bâtiments de la flotte de guerre française de Colbert à nos jours 2, 1870 - 2006. Toulon: Roche. ISBN 978-2-9525917-0-6. OCLC 165892922.
- Smigielski, Adam (1985). "France". In Gray, Randal (ed.). Conway's All the World's Fighting Ships 1906–1921. Annapolis, Maryland: Naval Institute Press. pp. 190–220. ISBN 0-87021-907-3.
