= Rovin =

French auto-maker

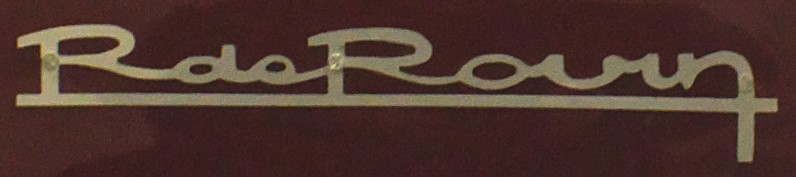
- Industry: Motor cycle dealer and producer Automobiles dealer and producer
- Founded: 1921 (initially as a motor cycle business); 1946 (regular automobile production)
- Defunct: 1958
- Headquarters: Paris, France
- Key people: Raoul Pegulu, Marquis of Rovin (1896-1949); Robert de Rovin

Rovin was a French auto-maker established in the Paris region, and most active from 1946 until 1959, although after 1953 production slowed to a trickle. The firm was established, initially as a motor-cycle business, in 1921 by the racing driver and motorcycle constructor, Raoul Pegulu, Marquis of Rovin (1896 - 1949). The car was developed by Raoul but in 1946 production became the responsibility of his brother, Robert who continued to run the business after Raoul's death.

== First steps as an automobile-producer ==
In the 1930s Rovin had turned his attention to a sportscar dealership which he established in Paris on the Boulevard Pereire. Although the business was at this stage concentrated on the dealership, Raoul Rovin was already offering a little car of his own design at the 20th Paris Motor Show in October 1926. Powered by a 4CV single cylinder 480cc motor, the offering was baptised by its manufacturer as the "Monocar", and was listed in two versions, either as a "Monocar Sport" for 19,000 francs or as a "Monocar Record" which was fitted with a compressor (a form of "turbo-charger") and priced at 22,000 francs.

== The Plant ==
The premises were not suitable for auto-production on the scale foreseen after the war, however, and in 1946 Rovin purchased the plant of Delaunay-Belleville, once famous as a luxury car maker and more recently also a builder of military trucks that had been deprived of customers by the dire state of the postwar economy and the return of peace to France. The plant was now adapted to build small cheap cars more appropriate to the times.

== Rovin Type D1 ==
The prototype Rovin D1 was presented at the Paris Motor Show towards the end of 1946. The car was a very small cabriolet.

It was powered by a single cylinder 260 cc air cooled four stroke engine. The engine's small size placed the car in the 2CV fiscal horse power category, and actual claimed power was only 6.5 hp. Supported by a three speed gear box, this permitted the manufacturer to claim a top speed of 70 km/h (44 mph). There were no doors, and the focus of sloping front of the car was a single headlight.

== Rovin Type D2 ==
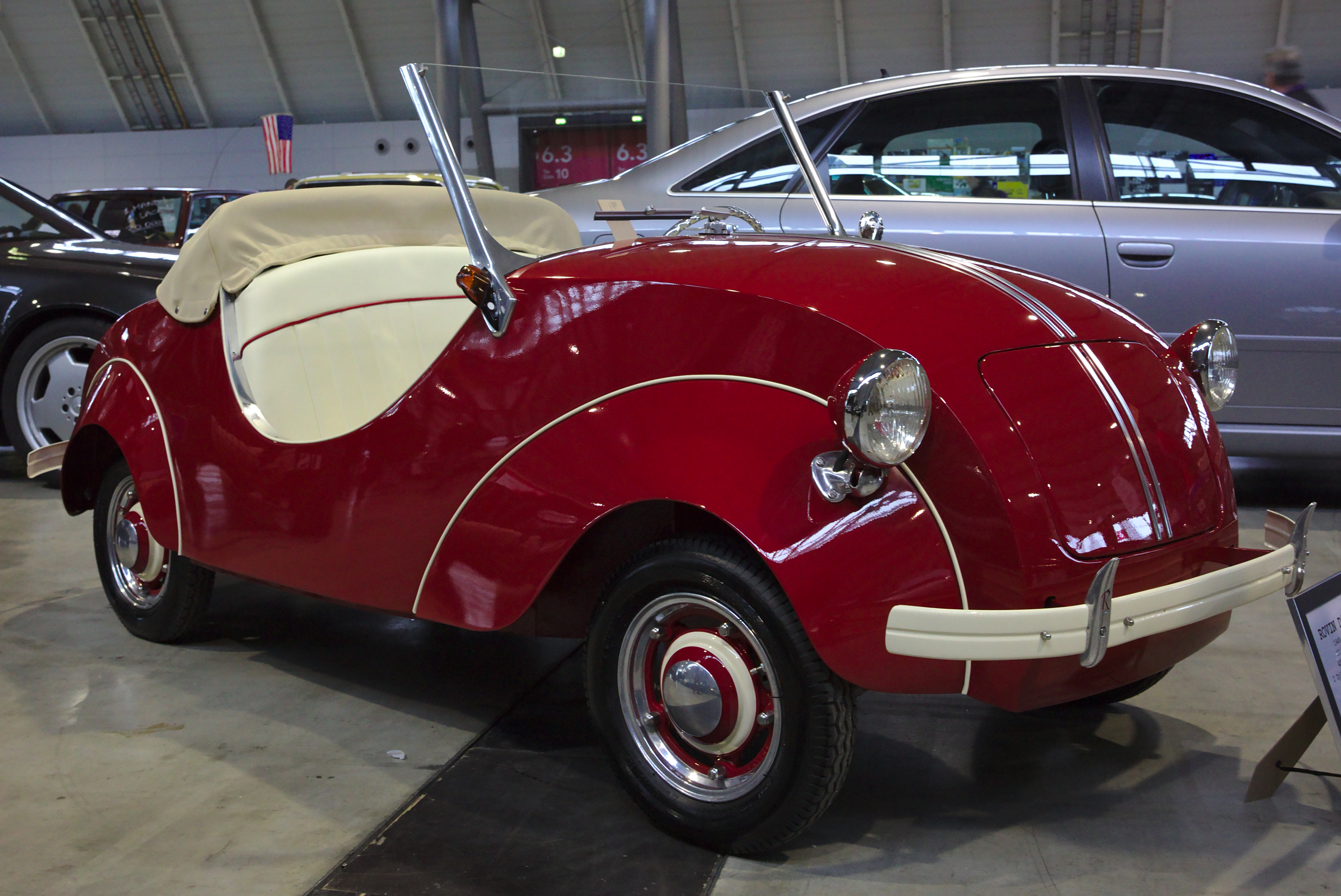
Rovin D2 (1949)

It is not clear whether the D1 was ever sold in significant numbers, but production of the Rovin D2 started in 1947 at the company's newly acquired plant at Saint-Denis. The car still qualified (just) for the 2CV fiscal horse power category, but the engine was now a flat twin 423 cc four stroke water cooled unit. Claimed power output was now 10 hp and the car still featured a three speed gear box. Top speed was "between 70 and 80 km/h (44- 50 mph).

The body was again very small, at just 2800 mm in length and with a 1700 mm wheelbase, and light-weight construction allowed for an empty weight of just 300 Kg. The vehicle now had two headlights. The engine was still at the back, but a small hatch in the body work right at the front of the car provided access to the battery.

Although most sales were in France, the car was also advertised in the francophone western Swiss press and exhibited at the Geneva Motor Show early in 1948.

During 1947 and 1948 approximately 700 D2s were produced.

== Rovin Type D3 ==
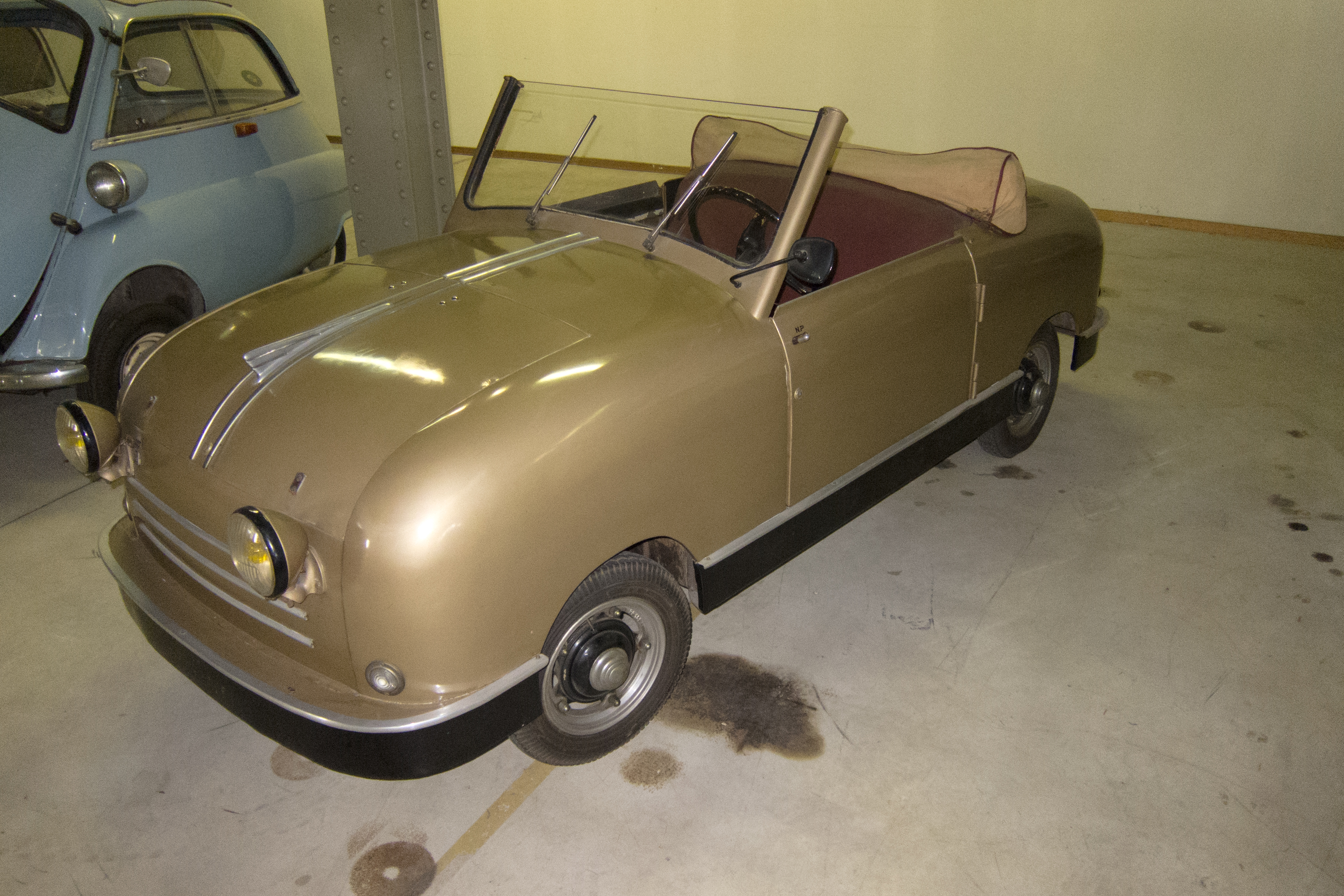
Rovin D3 (1949)

The D3 was little changed from the D2 under the skin, but the "skin" was an all new ponton format body with doors. The headlamps still stood out from the body, which presumably was a less costly solution than integrating them to the wings. The extra weight of doors and hinges and additional window did add some penalty and the car now weighted 380 kg. Nevertheless, a maximum speed of 75 km/h (47 mph) was claimed.

Between 1948 and 1950 approximately 800 D3s were made.

In 1947/1949 a few ROVIN cars were imported and sold in Uruguay. Alejo Neyeloff.

== Rovin Type D4 ==
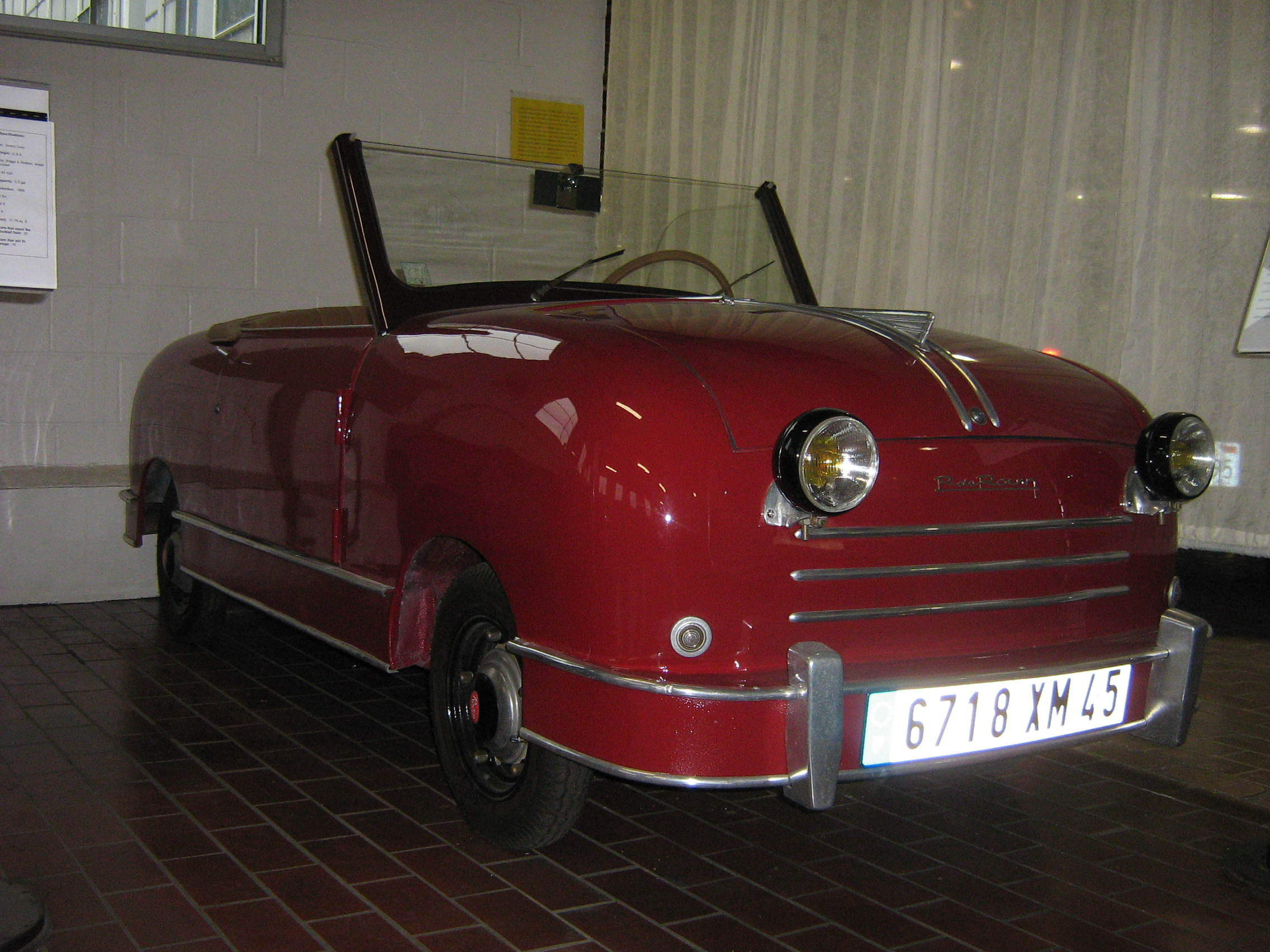
Rovin D4 (1953)

The D4 represented a mild evolution from the D3, with a larger front grille and the (still not integrated) headlights positioned a little higher.

The two cylinder engine was enlarged to 462 cc and now developed 13 hp. By now the overall length was 3150 mm on a wheelbase of 1800 mm. The gear box now featured four forward speeds and the top speed had increased to 85 km/h (53 mph). Minor cosmetic changes and suspension improvements were implemented towards the end of 1952.

About 1,200 D4s were produced between 1950 and 1953, but in 1953 production had slumped to just 110. Although the model continued to be listed for several more years it is not clear how many, if any, were produced after this.
