= French submarine Clorinde =

Early 20th-century French Navy submarine

History

France
- Name: Clorinde
- Ordered: 17 November 1910
- Builder: Arsenal de Rochefort
- Laid down: 6 November 1911
- Launched: 2 October 1913
- Commissioned: 17 September 1917
- Stricken: 15 January 1926
- Identification: Budget number: Q90
- Fate: Sold for scrap, 15 April 1927

General characteristics (as built)
- Class & type: Clorinde-class submarine
- Displacement: 422 t (415 long tons) (surfaced); 574 t (565 long tons) (submerged)
- Length: 53.95 m (177 ft 0 in) (o/a)
- Beam: 5.1 m (16 ft 9 in) (deep)
- Draft: 3.5 m (11 ft 6 in)
- Installed power: 400 PS (290 kW; 390 hp) diesel engines; 350 PS (260 kW; 350 hp) electric motors
- Propulsion: 2 shafts; 2 diesels; 2 electric motors
- Speed: 13 knots (24 km/h; 15 mph) (surfaced); 9 knots (17 km/h; 10 mph) (submerged)
- Range: 1,240 nmi (2,300 km; 1,430 mi) at 10.8 knots (20.0 km/h; 12.4 mph) (surfaced); 104 nmi (193 km; 120 mi) at 5.2 knots (9.6 km/h; 6.0 mph) (submerged)
- Complement: 27 crew
- Armament: 2 × 450 mm (17.7 in) external torpedo launchers; 6 × single 450 mm Drzewiecki drop collars; 1 × single 47 mm (1.9 in) deck gun

Clorinde was the lead boat of her class of submarines built for the French Navy during the 1910s. Completed in 1917, she played a minor role in World War I.

== Design and description ==
The Clorinde class was built as part of the French Navy's 1909 building program as improved versions of the Brumaire class. The boats displaced 422 metric tons (415 long tons) surfaced and 574 t (565 long tons) submerged. They had an overall length of 53.95 meters (177 ft 0 in), a beam of 5.1 meters (16 ft 9 in), and a draft of 3.5 meters (11 ft 6 in). Their crew numbered 27 officers and crewmen.

For surface running, the Clorinde-class boats were powered by a pair of two-cycle diesel engines, each driving one propeller shaft. The engines were intended to produce a total of 1,300 metric horsepower (1,282 bhp; 956 kW), but were generally only capable of 800 PS (789 bhp; 588 kW). During her sister Cornélie's sea trials, her eight-cylinder MAN-Loire engines only produced 750 PS (740 bhp; 552 kW), enough for a speed of 13.4 knots (24.8 km/h; 15.4 mph) rather than the designed 15 knots (28 km/h; 17 mph). The boats were generally capable of 13 knots (24 km/h; 15 mph) on the surface in service. When submerged each shaft was driven by a 350-metric-horsepower (345 bhp; 257 kW) electric motor. The designed speed underwater was 9.5 knots (17.6 km/h; 10.9 mph), but they only reached a speed of 9 knots (17 km/h; 10 mph) from 608 shp (616 PS; 453 kW) during trials. The Clorindes had enough fuel oil to give them a surface endurance of 1,240 nautical miles (2,300 km; 1,430 mi) at 10.8 knots (20.0 km/h; 12.4 mph). Their submerged endurance was 104 nmi (193 km; 120 mi) at 5.2 knots (9.6 km/h; 6.0 mph).

The boats were armed with a total of eight 450-millimeter (17.7 in) torpedoes. Two of these were positioned in the bow in torpedo launchers angled outwards 4° 30'. The other six were located in external rotating Drzewiecki drop collars, three on each broadside that could traverse 100 degrees to the side of the boats. The boats were also equipped with a 47 mm (1.9 in) Mle 1885-1915 deck gun aft of the conning tower.

== Construction and career ==
Clorinde was ordered on 17 November 1910 and was laid down at the Arsenal de Rochefort on 6 November 1911. She was launched on 2 October 1913 and commissioned on 17 September 1917.

== Bibliography ==
- Couhat, Jean Labayle (1974). French Warships of World War I. London: Ian Allan. ISBN 0-7110-0445-5.
- Garier, Gérard (2002). A l'épreuve de la Grande Guerre. L'odyssée technique et humaine du sous-marin en France (in French). Vol. 3–2. Bourg-en-Bresse, France: Marines édition. ISBN 2-909675-81-5.
- Garier, Gérard (2000). Des Clorinde (1912-1916) aux Diane (1912–1917). L'odyssée technique et humaine du sous-marin en France (in French). Vol. 3–1. Bourg-en-Bresse, France: Marines édition. ISBN 2-909675-54-8.
- Roberts, Stephen S. (2021). French Warships in the Age of Steam 1859–1914: Design, Construction, Careers and Fates. Barnsley, UK: Seaforth Publishing. ISBN 978-1-5267-4533-0.
- Roche, Jean-Michel (2005). Dictionnaire des bâtiments de la flotte de guerre française de Colbert à nos jours 2, 1870 - 2006. Toulon: Roche. ISBN 978-2-9525917-0-6. OCLC 165892922.
- Smigielski, Adam (1985). "France". In Gray, Randal (ed.). Conway's All the World's Fighting Ships 1906–1921. Annapolis, Maryland: Naval Institute Press. pp. 190–220. ISBN 0-87021-907-3.
