= Italian submarine Nereide =

Nereide was the name of at least two ships of the Italian Navy and may refer to:

- Italian submarine Nereide (1913), a Nautilus-class submarine launched in 1913 and sunk in 1915.
- Italian submarine Nereide (1933), a Sirena-class submarine launched in 1933 and sunk in 1943.
