= French submarine Néréide =

French submarine

History

France
- Name: Néréide
- Builder: Arsenal de Cherbourg
- Launched: 9 May 1914
- Completed: 31 October 1916
- Stricken: 1935
- Identification: Pennant number: Q93
- Fate: Scrapped

General characteristics (as built)
- Type: Gustave Zédé-class submarine
- Displacement: 850 t (837 long tons) (surfaced); 1,048 t (1,031 long tons) (submerged)
- Length: 74 m (242 ft 9 in) (o/a)
- Beam: 6 m (19 ft 8 in) (deep)
- Draft: 4.1 m (13 ft 5 in)
- Installed power: 1,640 PS (1,210 kW; 1,620 bhp) (electric motors); 2,400 PS (1,800 kW; 2,400 bhp) (diesels)
- Propulsion: 2 × shafts; 2 × electric motors; 2 × Diesel engines
- Speed: 16 knots (30 km/h; 18 mph) (surfaced); 10 knots (19 km/h; 12 mph) (submerged)
- Range: 2,700 nmi (5,000 km; 3,100 mi) at 14.2 knots (26.3 km/h; 16.3 mph)
- Complement: 43
- Armament: 2 × 450 mm (17.7 in) bow torpedo tubes; 6 × single external 450 mm torpedo launchers; 1 × 75 mm (3 in) deck gun

Néréide was the second and last Gustave Zédé-class submarine built for the French Navy during the 1910s. Completed during World War I in 1916, the boat played a minor role during the war.

== Design and description ==
The Gustave Zédé class was built as part of the French Navy's 1909 building program to satisfy an ambitious requirement for a "high-seas" (sous-marin de haute mer) submarine capable of a speed of 20 knots (37 km/h; 23 mph) on the surface. To reach this speed the sisters were to use a pair of 2,400-metric-horsepower (2,367 bhp; 1,765 kW) two-cycle diesel engines.

Néréide had an overall length of 74 meters (242 ft 9 in), a beam of 6 meters (19 ft 8 in), and a draft of 4.1 meters (13 ft 5 in). She displaced 850 metric tons (840 long tons) on the surface and 1,088 t (1,071 long tons) submerged. The crew of both boats numbered 43 officers and crewmen.

Néréide's diesels each drove one propeller shaft and were designed to produce a total of 4,800 PS (4,734 bhp; 3,530 kW), but only produced half that. These shortfall limited her to 16 knots (30 km/h; 18 mph) in service, although she reached 18.3 knots (33.9 km/h; 21.1 mph) from 2,335 bhp (2,367 PS; 1,741 kW) during her sea trials on 25 June 1916. When submerged each shaft was driven by a 820-metric-horsepower (809 shp; 603 kW) electric motor. The designed speed underwater was 11 knots (20 km/h; 13 mph); on 24 June, Néréide made 10.5 knots (19.4 km/h; 12.1 mph) from a total of 1,414 shp (1,434 PS; 1,054 kW). The boat carried enough fuel oil to give her surfaced range of 2,700 nautical miles (5,000 km; 3,100 mi) at 14.2 knots (26.3 km/h; 16.3 mph) and demonstrated a submerged endurance of 359 nmi (665 km; 413 mi) at 2.8 knots (5.2 km/h; 3.2 mph).

The sisters were armed with a total of eight 450-millimeter (17.7 in) torpedoes. Néréide had two fixed internal torpedo tubes in the bow and a pair of fixed tubes forward of the conning tower. The other four were located in external rotating torpedo launchers, two on each broadside that could traverse 160–165 degrees to the side of the boats. She was equipped with a 75 mm (3 in) deck gun forward of the conning tower.

== Construction and career ==
Néréide was ordered on 14 February 1911 and was laid down at the Arsenal de Cherbourg on 11 January 1912. She was launched on 9 May 1915 and commissioned on 31 October 1916.

== Bibliography ==
- Couhat, Jean Labayle (1974). French Warships of World War I. London: Ian Allan. ISBN 0-7110-0445-5.
- Garier, Gérard (2002). A l'épreuve de la Grande Guerre. L'odyssée technique et humaine du sous-marin en France (in French). Vol. 3–2. Bourg-en-Bresse, France: Marines édition. ISBN 2-909675-81-5.
- Garier, Gérard (2000). Des Clorinde (1912-1916) aux Diane (1912–1917). L'odyssée technique et humaine du sous-marin en France (in French). Vol. 3–1. Bourg-en-Bresse, France: Marines édition. ISBN 2-909675-54-8.
- Roberts, Stephen S. (2021). French Warships in the Age of Steam 1859–1914: Design, Construction, Careers and Fates. Barnsley, UK: Seaforth Publishing. ISBN 978-1-5267-4533-0.
- Roche, Jean-Michel (2005). Dictionnaire des bâtiments de la flotte de guerre française de Colbert à nos jours 2, 1870 - 2006. Toulon: Roche. ISBN 978-2-9525917-0-6. OCLC 165892922.
- Smigielski, Adam (1985). "France". In Gray, Randal (ed.). Conway's All the World's Fighting Ships 1906–1921. Annapolis, Maryland: Naval Institute Press. pp. 190–220. ISBN 0-87021-907-3.
