= French submarine Gustave Zédé (1913) =

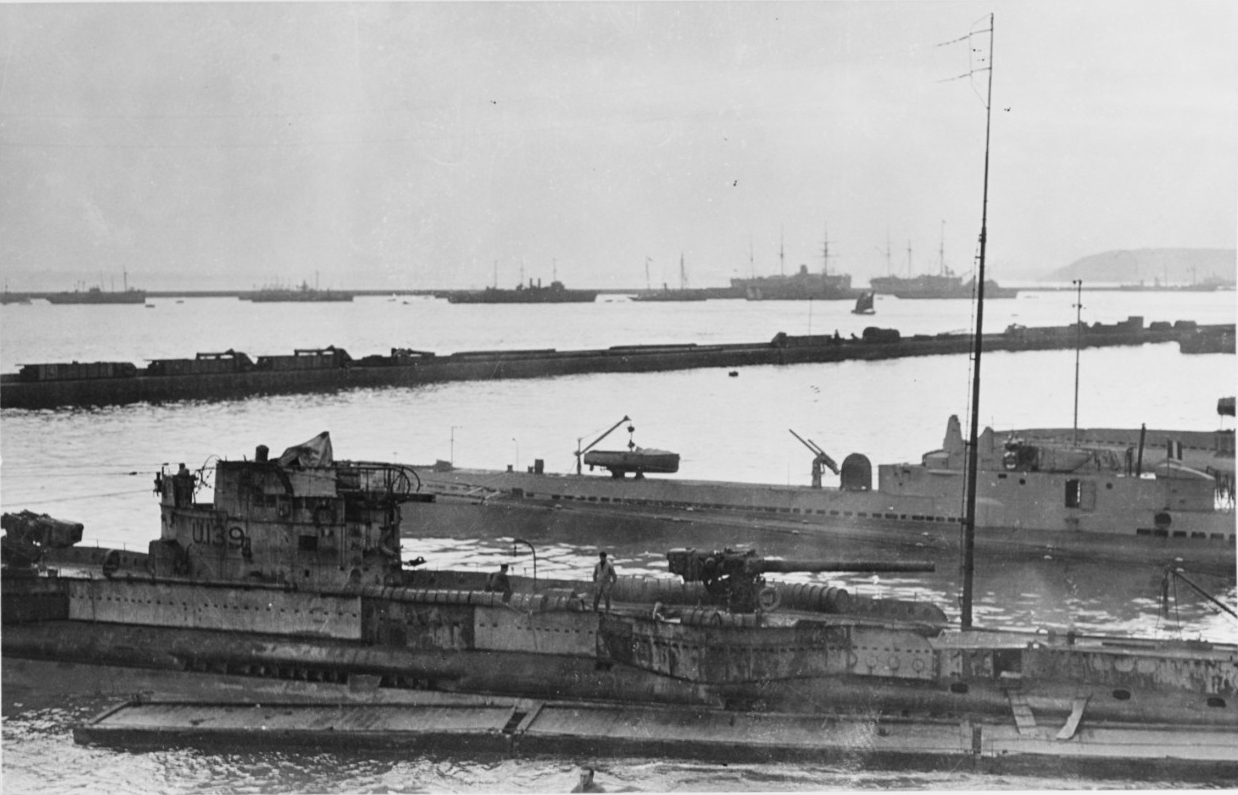

History

France
- Name: Gustave Zédé
- Ordered: 14 February 1911
- Builder: Arsenal de Cherbourg
- Laid down: 7 August 1911
- Launched: 20 May 1913
- Completed: 10 October 1914
- Stricken: 27 January 1937
- Identification: Budget number: Q92
- Fate: Sold for scrap, 21 April 1938

General characteristics (as built)
- Class & type: Gustave Zédé-class submarine
- Displacement: 850 t (837 long tons) (surfaced); 1,099 t (1,082 long tons) (submerged)
- Length: 74 m (242 ft 9 in) (o/a)
- Beam: 6 m (19 ft 8 in) (deep)
- Draft: 4.2 m (13 ft 9 in)
- Installed power: 1,640 PS (1,210 kW; 1,620 bhp) (electric motors); 3,500 PS (2,600 kW; 3,500 bhp) (Du Temple boilers)
- Propulsion: 2 × shafts; 2 × electric motors; 2 × triple-expansion steam engines
- Speed: 16 knots (30 km/h; 18 mph) (surfaced); 11 knots (20 km/h; 13 mph) (submerged)
- Range: 1,242 nmi (2,300 km; 1,429 mi) at 13.4 knots (24.8 km/h; 15.4 mph) (surfaced); 135 nmi (250 km; 155 mi) at 5 knots (9.3 km/h; 5.8 mph) (submerged)
- Complement: 43
- Armament: 2 × 450 mm (17.7 in) bow torpedo tubes; 6 × single external 450 mm torpedo launchers

Gustave Zédé was the lead boat of her class of two submarines built for the French Navy during the 1910s, just before World War I. The boat was intended to use diesel engines, but they were cancelled she was under construction and steam engines were substituted.

== Design and description ==
The Gustave Zédé class was built as part of the French Navy's 1909 building program to satisfy an ambitious requirement for a "high-seas" (sous-marin de haute mer) submarine capable of a speed of 20 knots (37 km/h; 23 mph) on the surface. To reach this speed the sisters were to use a pair of 2,400-metric-horsepower (2,367 bhp; 1,765 kW) two-cycle diesel engines. The navy placed an order for Gustave Zédé's engines with Ateliers et Chantiers de la Loire which were to be a license-built design by MAN, but MAN declared that it could not provide blueprints for such powerful engines and the contract was cancelled in 1912. The navy decided to use instead readily available Delaunay-Belleville vertical triple-expansion steam engines in 1912.

The boat had an overall length of 74 meters (242 ft 9 in), a beam of 6 meters (19 ft 8 in), and a draft of 4.2 meters (13 ft 9 in). Gustave Zédé displaced 850 metric tons (840 long tons) on the surface and 1,099 t (1,082 long tons) underwater. Her crew of numbered 43 officers and crewmen.

Gustave Zédé's three-cylinder steam engines each drove one propeller shaft and were designed to produce a total of 4,000 ihp (4,055 PS; 2,983 kW) using steam from two du Temple boilers, but could only produce 3,500 ihp (3,549 PS; 2,610 kW). This shortfall limited the boat to 16 knots (30 km/h; 18 mph) in service. When submerged each shaft was driven by a 820-metric-horsepower (809 bhp; 603 kW) electric motor. The designed speed underwater was 11 knots (20 km/h; 13 mph); during her sea trials on 21 August 1913, Gustave Zédé reached 11.44 knots (21.19 km/h; 13.16 mph) from 1,875 shp (1,901 PS; 1,398 kW). She carried 69 t (68 long tons) of fuel oil which gave her a surfaced range of 1,242 nautical miles (2,300 km; 1,429 mi) at 13.4 knots (24.8 km/h; 15.4 mph) and a submerged endurance estimated at 135 nmi (250 km; 155 mi) at 5 knots (9.3 km/h; 5.8 mph).

The sisters were armed with a total of eight 450-millimeter (17.7 in) torpedoes. Gustave Zédé had two fixed internal torpedo tubes in the bow. The other six were located in external rotating torpedo launchers, three on each broadside that could traverse 160–165 degrees to the side of the boats. The boat was not initially fitted with a deck gun.

== Construction and career ==
Gustave Zédé was ordered on 14 February 1911 and was laid down at the Arsenal de Cherbourg on 7 August. She was launched on 20 May 1913 and commissioned on 10 October 1916.

== Bibliography ==
- Couhat, Jean Labayle (1974). French Warships of World War I. London: Ian Allan. ISBN 0-7110-0445-5.
- Garier, Gérard (2002). A l'épreuve de la Grande Guerre. L'odyssée technique et humaine du sous-marin en France (in French). Vol. 3–2. Bourg-en-Bresse, France: Marines édition. ISBN 2-909675-81-5.
- Garier, Gérard (2000). Des Clorinde (1912-1916) aux Diane (1912–1917). L'odyssée technique et humaine du sous-marin en France (in French). Vol. 3–1. Bourg-en-Bresse, France: Marines édition. ISBN 2-909675-54-8.
- Roberts, Stephen S. (2021). French Warships in the Age of Steam 1859–1914: Design, Construction, Careers and Fates. Barnsley, UK: Seaforth Publishing. ISBN 978-1-5267-4533-0.
- Roche, Jean-Michel (2005). Dictionnaire des bâtiments de la flotte de guerre française de Colbert à nos jours 2, 1870 - 2006. Toulon: Roche. ISBN 978-2-9525917-0-6. OCLC 165892922.
- Smigielski, Adam (1985). "France". In Gray, Randal (ed.). Conway's All the World's Fighting Ships 1906–1921. Annapolis, Maryland: Naval Institute Press. pp. 190–220. ISBN 0-87021-907-3.
