= Nereidi =

Sculpture in Helsinki, Finland

Coordinates: 60°11′16.1″N 24°58′45.74″E

Nereidi (Finnish for "the nereid") is a sculpture by Hans-Christian Berg, located in the Kalasatama district in Helsinki, Finland. The seven-metre-tall sculpture is located at the southern end of the Kalasatamankatu street in front of the Redi shopping centre. The two-part sculpture consists of a concrete wave-shaped pedestal and a figure made of laser cut and painted aluminium plates. The nereids were mermaids in Greek mythology.

The sculpture looks different depending on which direction it is viewed from. From afar it looks like it consists of lines, and viewed from the side it looks like a figure gazing off into the distance with its head tilted back. Hans-Christian Berg has used optical illusions in many of his works and made his works by combining different materials and building techniques. The sculpture Nereidi is made of parts ordered from all over Finland, connected by welding, riveting and screwing. The lights were installed last. Building the entire sculpture took four days.

The shopping centre Redi, built by the construction company SRV, required artworks in its vicinity. An international contest was held in 2016, requiring entries to be of sufficient size in regard to the buildings and to express joy and cleverness. Artists submitted graffiti, ceramics, paintings, mobiles, a relief, light art and sculptures. The location of Nereidi was chosen by representatives of the architecture bureau Helin & Co who had designed the shopping centre and of the city of Helsinki. The chosen location was intended to become a meeting point. The sculpture was revealed on 2 June 2021.
