= French submarine Gustave Zédé (1893) =

Early submarine of the French Navy

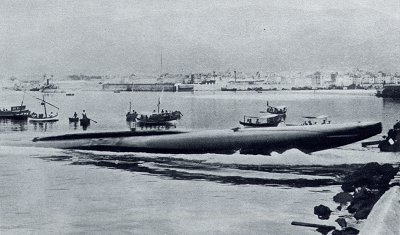
- Launch of Gustave Zédé, June 1893

History

France
- Name: former Sirène, then Gustave Zédé
- Ordered: 4 October 1890
- Laid down: 1 February 1891
- Launched: 1 June 1893
- Commissioned: 1 May 1900
- Out of service: 9 August 1908
- Fate: Sold for scrap, 2 August 1911

General characteristics
- Type: Submarine
- Displacement: 260 long tons (264 t) surfaced; 270 long tons (274 t) submerged
- Length: 148 ft (45 m)
- Beam: 10 ft (3.0 m)
- Installed power: Originally 720 battery cells, redesigned to 300 in 1895; (no onboard means to recharge batteries)
- Propulsion: 2 × 360 hp (268 kW) Sauter-Harlé electric motors
- Speed: 9 knots (17 km/h; 10 mph) surfaced; 6.5 knots (12.0 km/h; 7.5 mph) submerged
- Range: 220 nmi (410 km; 250 mi) at 5.5 knots (10.2 km/h; 6.3 mph) surfaced; 105 nmi (194 km; 121 mi) at 4.5 knots (8.3 km/h; 5.2 mph) submerged
- Crew: 19
- Armament: 1 × 14 in (360 mm) Fiume 'short' torpedoes; 2 × torpedoes in Drzewiecki drop collars

Gustave Zédé was one of the world's earliest commissioned naval submarines. She was launched on 1 July 1893 at Toulon, France, although only formally entering service with the French Navy in May 1900 after a long series of trials and design alterations. The submarine carried out the first successful torpedo attack by a submerged vessel against a surface ship.

Initially ordered as Sirène on 4 October 1890, on 1 May 1891 the boat was renamed after Gustave Zédé, a naval architect who had worked on its design, but who died in 1891 following an explosion during the development of an experimental torpedo. Development followed on from the previous smaller design, Gymnote. Both ships were electrically propelled using power from storage batteries.

== Development ==
The French Navy had become interested in unconventional approaches to naval warfare in its attempts to face the numerically superior Royal Navy, and was an early adopter of the torpedo and torpedo boat for use against battleships. As part of this program, they became interested in the submarine, able to approach undetected to within torpedo range. Gustave Zédé was the second experimental submarine developed for the French Navy.

The ship's principal constructor was Gaston Romazotti who took control of the project after the death of Gustave Zédé in 1891. Construction and development took ten years, in part because interest in submarines in the French Navy came and went with the changing policies of different ministers of marine, and because of ongoing development of the design during this time.

== Characteristics ==
The hull was made of bronze rather than steel to resist corrosion, which also allowed a magnetic compass to operate inside. It had a different profile fore and aft, unlike other submarines at this time which tended to be the same shape either end. Seventy-six longitudinal round ribs provided the strength of the hull.

The boat had two centrally placed ballast tanks and trimming tanks at either end. Electric pumps were used to redistribute the water. There was a detachable central lead keel. The ship was initially fitted with manually operated diving rudder at the stern as in the design of Gymnote, but proved difficult to maintain level or on a steady incline while diving or rising. Hydraulic hydroplanes were therefore added at the center of the ship and forwards. The ship was designed to dive to a depth of 50 feet (15 m). A periscope was fitted in the conning tower which gave a field of view 20° above and 7° below the horizon but the view was distorted and of limited use.

The boat was electrically driven with power supplied by a bank of batteries. Two 360 hp Sauter-Harlé DC electric motors were coupled to the single propeller drive shaft operating at 250 rpm. Together the motors weighed 27 tons. The original Laurant-Celvieva battery configuration was of 720 cells weighing 130 tons capable of delivering 1,800A at 300V. The battery system exploded on first charging causing a fire, so a new layout of only 360 cells was installed. This led to a significant reduction of surface speed from 15 to 8 knots. The boat had no alternative power source on board which could be used to recharge the batteries, unlike other contemporary designs such as the Holland VI design which had a petrol engine as well as batteries.

== Service history ==
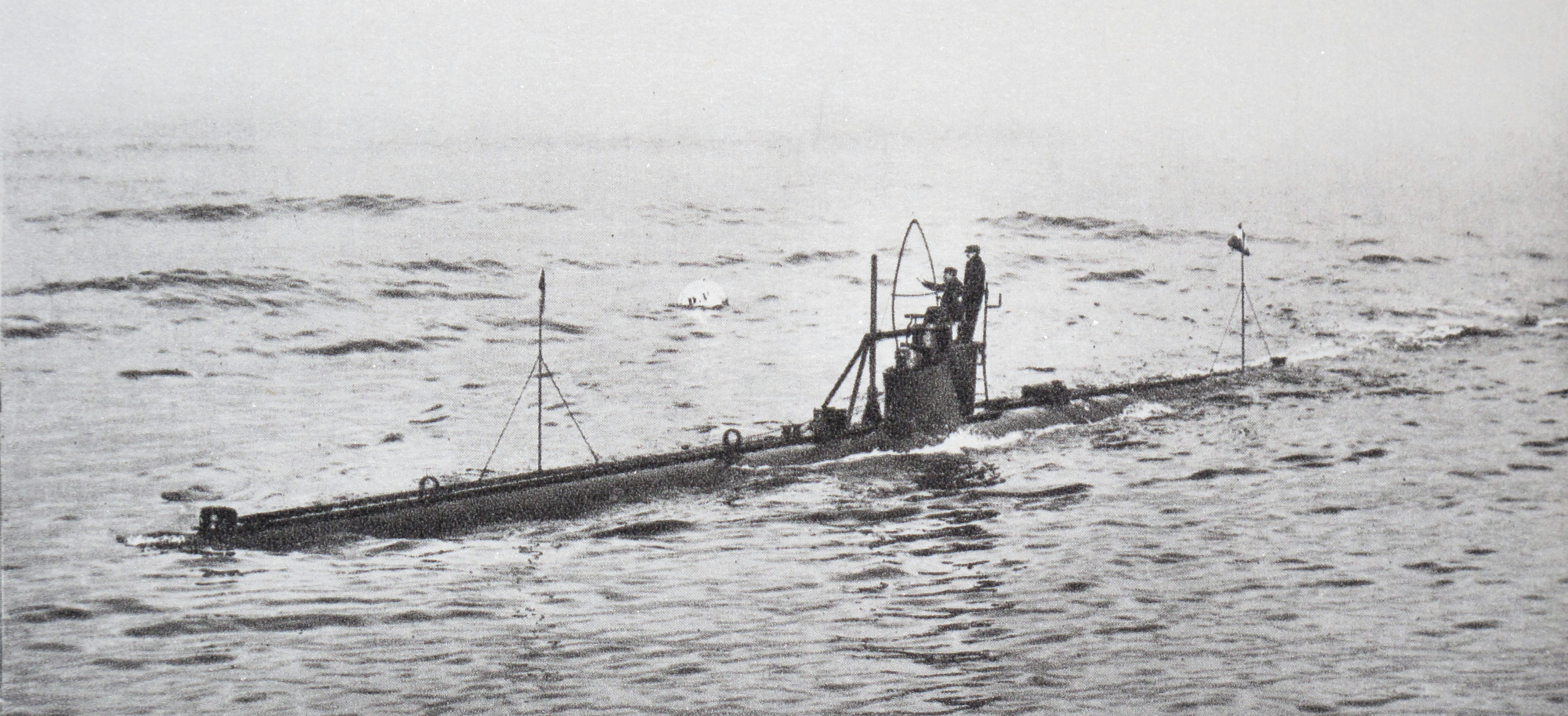
Gustave Zédé underway

In December 1898 Gustave Zédé took part in naval exercises with the Mediterranean fleet commanded by Admiral François Fournier. The submarine successfully twice attacked the gunnery training ship Magenta, once at anchor and once while the battleship was underway, after travelling the forty miles (64 km) from Toulon to the Îles d'Hyères. Gustave Zédé was commanded by Lieutenant Lucian Mottez. This was the first recorded successful attack by a submerged submarine using torpedoes against a surface target and was widely reported in naval circles.

The British Naval Attaché reported that Gustave Zédé was observed approaching Magenta at a speed of 10 knots (19 km/h; 12 mph) and a distance of 3,500 yards (3,200 m) with four men on the bridge. The submarine then submerged until only the conning tower was visible. At 1,500 yards (1,400 m) the conning tower had disappeared but some wash from the screw could be observed. The boat then submerged to a depth of 10 feet (3.0 m). At 450 yards (410 m) the ship came to the surface momentarily to check her distance and course, before diving again and firing a torpedo at a range of 270 yards (250 m), striking Magenta amidships. The submarine passed under the ship and resurfaced on the opposite side.

The exercise was repeated early in 1899 in front of the French Minister of Marine and invited journalists. The successful demonstration resulted in further funding to purchase more submarines for the French Navy.

== See also ==
- List of submarines of France
