= Louis Delaunay-Belleville =

French engineer (1843–1912)

Louis Delaunay Belleville
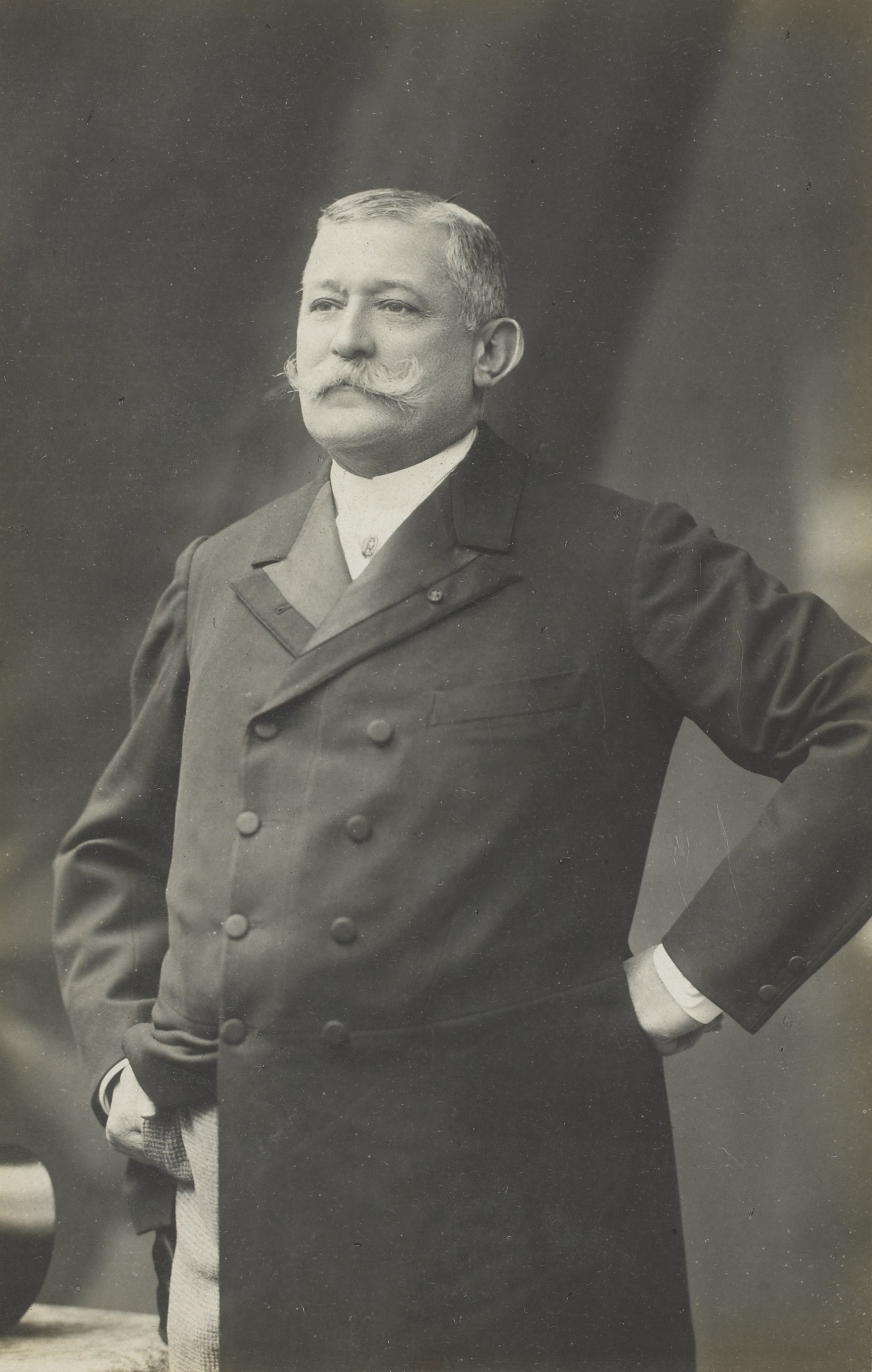
- Born: 20 November 1843; Corbeil, France
- Died: 10 February 1912 (aged 68); Cannes, France
- Other names: Louis Marie Gabriel Delaunay
- Occupation: Business
- Title: engineer
- Predecessor: Julien Belleville
- Spouse: Marie Anne Elisabeth Belleville
- Children: Robert Delaunay Belleville (1870) and Pierre Delaunay Belleville (1872)
- Awards: Legion of Honor, Cross of Order of Charles III, Crosses of Naval Merit

Notes
- owner of Delaunay-Belleville & C. firm producing boilers for ships and steam-locomotive in Saint Denis sur Seine, France

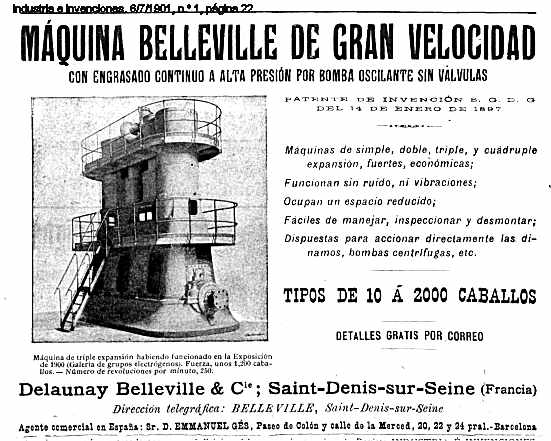

Louis Delaunay-Belleville (French pronunciation: [lwi dəlonɛ bɛlvil]; 20 November 1843, Corbeil – 10 February 1912, Cannes) was a French engineer.

== Personal life ==
Educated at St. Barbe and the École Polytechnique, he entered the Naval Engineering School in 1864 and in 1867 left to join the Belleville works at St. Denis, near Paris.

He married Marie Anne Elisabeth Belleville daughter of Julien Belleville (1823–1896) and he became a partner and finally head of the firm which produced the well-known Belleville boilers, and later the Delaunay-Belleville automobile. In 1884 he changed his surname to Delaunay-Belleville.

== Encharges ==
- President of the Paris Chamber of Commerce from 1890 to 1909
- Régent of Banque of France
- Directeur Général Exposition Universelle de Paris (1900).

== Books ==
- Du régime commercial des ports de navigation intérieure en France
- Lois et règlements concernant les appareils à vapeur, en Europe et aux États-Unis d'Amérique

== Honours ==
- He was conferred in Spain Cross of Naval Merit on 11 April 1899
- He was conferred the Grand Officier de la Légion d'honneur on 12 April 1900.
- He was conferred in Spain Cross of Order of Charles III on 25 October 1900

== Sources ==
- Chisholm, Hugh, ed. (1922). "Delaunay-Belleville, Louis" . Encyclopædia Britannica (12th ed.). London & New York: The Encyclopædia Britannica Company.
