= Rasa Clorinda =

Indian Christian missionary

Clarinda
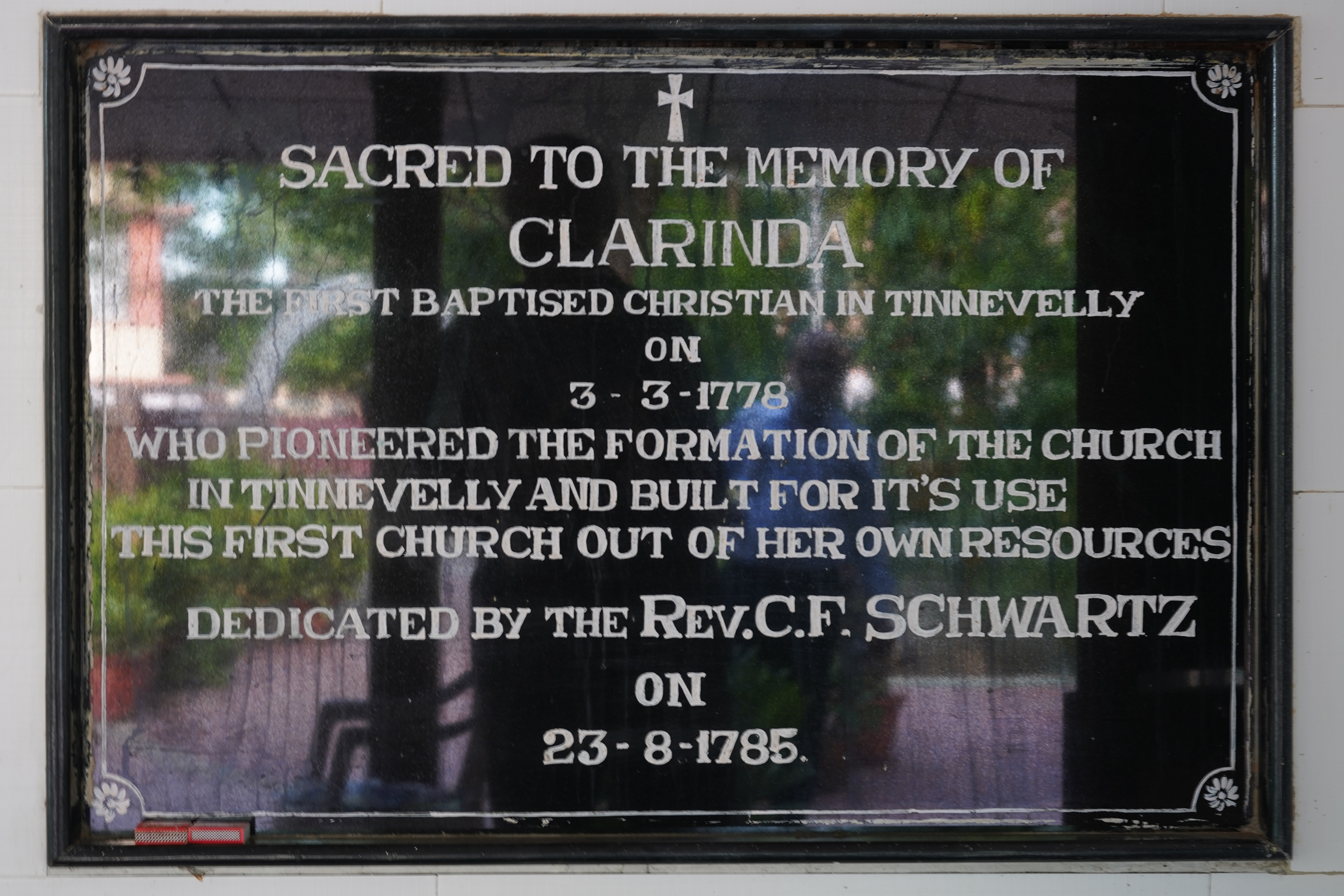
- Plaque in Clarinda Church
- Born: Kokila c. 1746; Thanjavur Maratha kingdom (now Thanjavur, Tamil Nadu, India)
- Died: c. 1806 (aged 56-60)
- Occupation: Missionary/Social Worker
- Known for: First Indian Christian missionary in Tirunelveli
- Notable work: Clarinda Church, c. 1785

Clarinda (sometimes known also as Clorinda) (c. 1746 – c. 1806) was an Indian Christian missionary, founder of a church in Tirunelveli. She was the first Christian convert of Tirunelveli and also built the first Church of Protestant Christian worship, namely, the well known, Clarinda Church, situated near St. John's College, Palayamkottai, Tirunelveli.

== Early years ==
According to the historical romance novel 'Clarinda A Historical Novel' which is based on the real life of Clarinda, written closer to the times Clarinda lived and the basis for the character profiling of Clarinda and some events of her life in this article, her maiden name was Kokila. She was the ward of her grandfather and was brought up with loving care and given the best of education. As a young girl she was diligent, tenacious and accomplished. Even at that tender age she showed a sense of empathy and was kind and gentle to all. At the same time she was contemporary and bold with outspoken ideas against the customs and superstitions, specifically that of the treatment of women, of those times - characteristics indicating the redoubtable lady she will one day become, as her benefactors would like to say.

== Marriage and after ==
According to common custom in those days she was given in marriage early to a wealthy man of high rank in the royal court. But a short time later her husband died leaving her a widow. It is a common belief that she was rescued from the funeral pyre of the ensuing Sati, by a soldier of the British army, Henry Lyttleton, who was passing along and who took pity on her seeing the plight of her horrendous circumstances. (The historical romance novel (fiction) 'Clarinda A Historical Novel' provides a detailed account of this event.)

== Clarinda and Lyttleton ==
After the rescue, Clarinda and Lyttleton started living together as they found the relationship to be compatible. It is said that they had a son from this consummate partnership though they remained unmarried. Lyttleton being a British Protestant Christian started to familiarise her with the Christian doctrine which she imbibed and embraced wholeheartedly.

== Conversion and baptism ==
At this point she had personally embraced Christianity completely and had started to live accordingly. Since generally baptism of some kind is a necessary requirement in the Christian doctrine she requested (1774) Rev. C. F. Schwartz, who was a British CMS (Church Mission Society) missionary doing service in those parts and with whom she was acquainted, to baptise her. Anyway Schwartz refused to comply as he thought she was leading a questionable life of sin of illegal partnership. Meanwhile, Lyttleton suddenly died from gout. After about four years (1778), Clarinda once again requested Schwartz to baptise her saying, now that her partner was dead, her past life should in no way be detrimental for her baptism. This time Schwartz, taking into account her life of devotion and selfless service, did not refuse and duly baptised her (1778), changing her name to Clarinda. She was the very first Christian convert in Tirunelveli District.

== Missionary work and social service ==
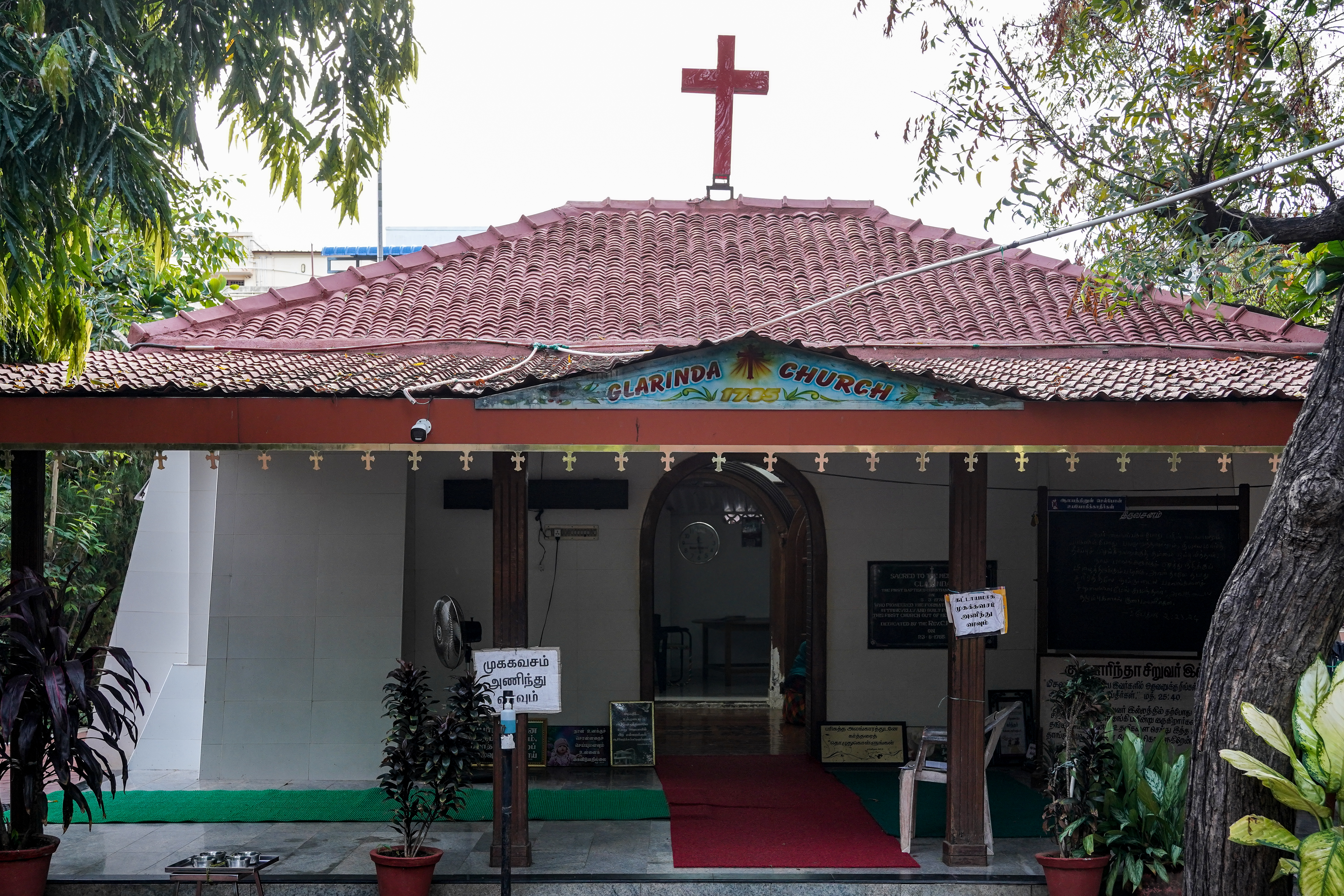
Front of Clarinda Church. Apr '22

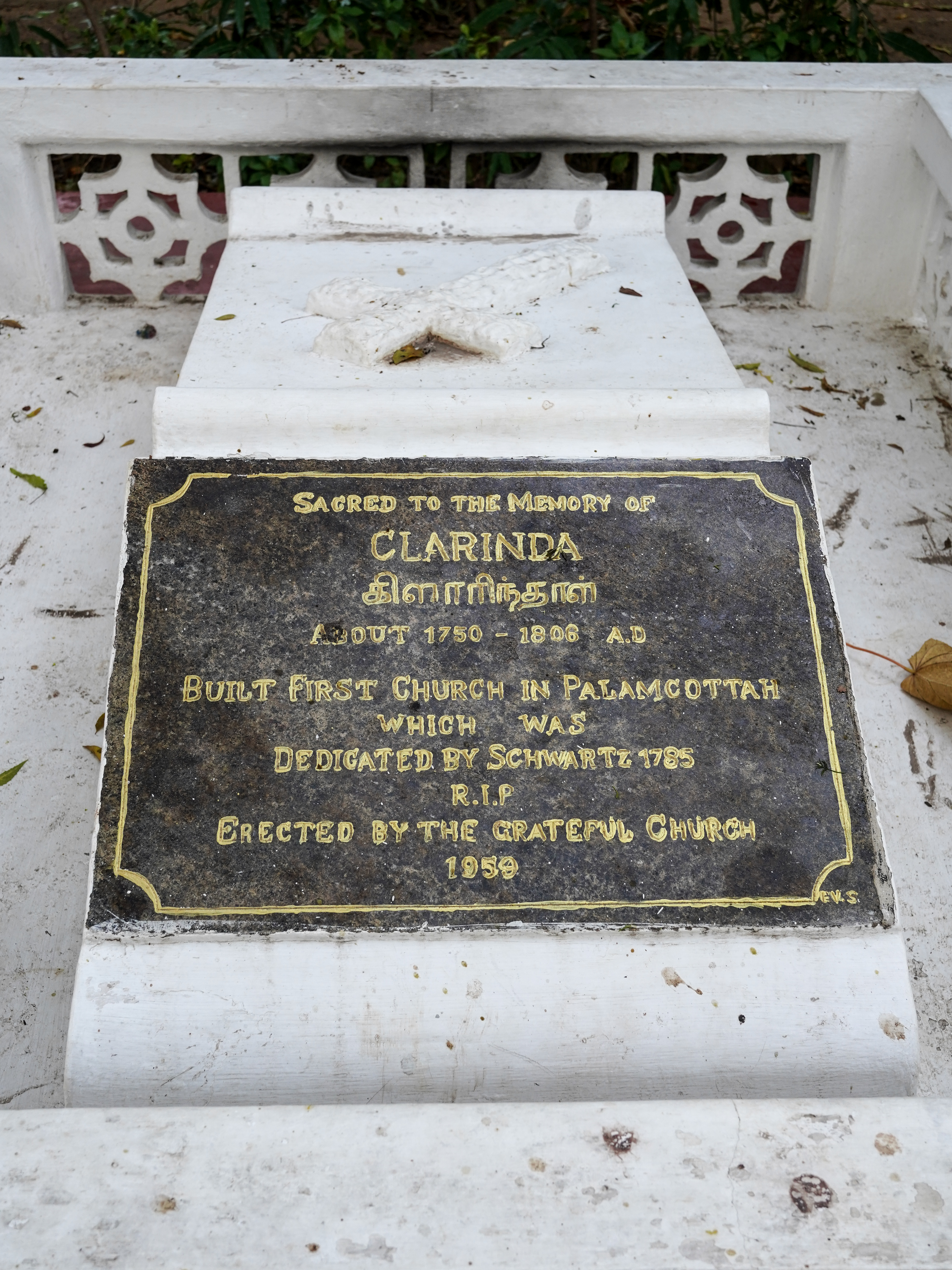
Clarinda's gravestone in the church yard. Apr. '22

After her baptism she immersed herself in the missionary work and social services with complete zeal. She brought more willing people into Christianity through conversion in Tirunelveli and suburbs and built the Clarinda Church in Palayamkottai (1784) for the small congregation of fifty people or so to gather and worship. This Church/congregation is said to be the pioneer of the Diocese system that is now in place. She took up the cause of the under privileged, downtrodden, destitutes, widows, orphans providing them the necessary support and aid and education, particularly helping the uneducated poor women towards their empowerment. In this regard, she found ways to build on the shared ethical ideals of certain Hindu and Christian communities to improve the lives of India women, even in that early semi-unenlightened era. She had the Clarinda Church consecrated by Schwartz (1785). This Church now is a major place of worship for Christians and others as well. She was instrumental in building schools in Palayamkottai which are now major educational institutions and other small Churches for the congregations she had managed to form in neighboring villages. For all this she used her own private funds without depending much on contributions or grants. She had to face, along the way, innumerable difficulties, from the non Christian majority around, the schisms of the Church, personal short comings and unexpected hindrances. But she was undaunted and never gave up on her purpose. Many among the Christian communities consider her a veritable and renowned missionary worker of her times. She died in c. 1806.

== Legacy ==
A. Madhaviah, a pioneer of the Tamil novel, brought out a biographical novel in English, titled Clarinda (1915). The work was translated into Tamil in 1976 by the Christian Literature Society (CLS).
