= Emerald (disambiguation) =

Emerald is a green gemstone. Because of its color, the word emerald is often used to describe a shade of green.

Emerald may also refer to:

== Arts, literature, and entertainment ==
=== Music ===
- The Detroit Emeralds, an American R&B vocal group most active in the 1970s
- Emerald (Alan Stivell album), 2009
- Emerald (Dar Williams album), 2015
- Emerald (ballet), the first movement of George Balanchine's Jewels, often performed by itself
- Emeralds (band), an ambient music trio from Cleveland, Ohio
- Emerald (band), a Swiss heavy metal band
- "Emerald" (Thin Lizzy song)
- "Emerald" by Dove Cameron, from Final Girl (2026)

=== Video games ===
- Pokémon Emerald, one of the Pokémon video games
- Emerald (Pokémon), a main character in Pokémon Adventures
- Chaos Emeralds, a set of gems with mythical powers in the Sonic the Hedgehog franchise

=== Literature ===
- The Emerald City of Oz, a 1910 book by L. Frank Baum

== Biology ==
- Several species of hummingbird called emeralds in the genera
  - Chlorostilbon
  - Cynanthus
  - Elvira
  - Amazilia
- Emerald damselflies, members of the family Lestidae
- Emerald dragonflies, members of the family Corduliidae
- Large emerald, a moth of the family Geometridae
- Emerald dove, a pigeon
- Emerald toucanet, Aulacorhynchus prasinus, a near-passerine bird

== Business ==
- Emerald Group Publishing, a UK publisher of management and business journals
- Emerald Music, a record label
- Emerald Records (1966), a record label
- Emerald Records (2000s), a record label
- Emerald snack nuts, a product line manufactured by Diamond Foods

== Computers and software ==
- Emerald (window decorator), a theme manager for Compiz
- Emerald (programming language), a distributed Object-Oriented programming language

== Fictional characters and places ==
- Emerald City, a fictional city in the Land of Oz in the book
- Emerald Empress, a DC Comics supervillain
- Emerald, the name given to Green Esmeraude in the English-language version of the anime Sailor Moon
- Emerald Haywood, a character from the 2022 film Nope
- Emerald Zirconia Goldenbraid, a main character in Mysticons in which she is the legendary Mysticon Knight
- Emerald, a character from the series Steven Universe
- Emerald Sustrai, a character from the series RWBY

== People ==
- Caro Emerald (born 1981), Dutch jazz singer
- Marti Emerald, elected member of the San Diego City Council
- Emerald (given name)

== Places ==
=== Australia ===
- Emerald, Queensland, a town in the Central Highlands Region
- Emerald, Victoria, a suburb of Melbourne
- Emerald, New South Wales, a small township north of Coffs Harbour

=== Canada ===
- Emerald, Prince Edward Island
- Emerald, Ontario
- Rural Municipality of Emerald No. 277, Saskatchewan
- Emerald Park, Saskatchewan

=== United States ===
- Emerald Lake Hills, California
- Emerald Triangle, California
- Emerald Coast, Florida
- Emerald Township, Minnesota
- Emerald Beach, Missouri
- Emerald, Nebraska
- Emerald Isle, North Carolina
- Emerald, Pennsylvania
- Emerald, Texas, a ghost town in Crockett County, Texas
- Emerald (CDP), Wisconsin, an unincorporated community
- Emerald, Wisconsin, a town
- Emerald Grove, Wisconsin, an unincorporated community

=== Other places ===
- Emerald Island, a nickname for the island of Lesbos
- Emerald Isle, a nickname for Ireland
- Equatorial Emerald (Zamrud khatulistiwa), a nickname for Indonesia, see Names of Indonesia

== Ships ==
- Emerald-class cruiser, light cruiser class of two ships in service with the British Royal Navy from 1926 to 1946–1948
- Emerald (HBC vessel), operated by the HBC in 1816 and 1817, see Hudson's Bay Company vessels
- Emerald Princess, 2006 cruise ship
- Emerald (steam yacht), 1903 steam yacht
- HMS Emerald, name of several British Royal Navy ships
- SS The Emerald, 1958 Greek-owned passenger cruise ship chartered by Thomson Holidays
- USS Emerald, name of more than one United States Navy ship

== Other ==
- The Emerald (building), a high-rise residential building in Seattle, Washington, United States
- Emerald Beach Club, South Andros, Andros, Bahamas; a former beach resort
- Emerald (mango), named mango cultivar that originated in Florida
- Emerald Buddha, a figurine of Buddha made of green jade
- Emerald network, an ecological network to conserve wild flora and fauna and their natural habitats of Europe
- Emerald Tablet, an alchemical text attributed to Hermes Trismegistus
- Emeralds (Super Fours), a women's cricket team that competed in the Super Fours
- Eugene Emeralds, minor league baseball team in Eugene, Oregon
- Oatfield Emerald, a type of chocolate toffee sweet native to Ireland
- Emerald Anniversary, associated with a 55th anniversary

== See also ==
- Emerald City (disambiguation)
- Emerald Lake (disambiguation)
- Émeraude (disambiguation), various meanings
- Esmeralda (disambiguation)
