= French ship Émeraude =

At least four ships of the French Navy have borne the name Émeraude:

- French frigate Émeraude (1779), a frigate launched in 1779 and broken up in 1797
- French submarine Émeraude (1906), an Émeraude-class submarine launched in 1906 and sold for scrap in 1923
- French submarine Émeraude, an Émeraude-class submarine destroyed incomplete on the slip in 1940
- French submarine Émeraude (S604), a Rubis-class submarine launched in 1986
