= Émeraude-class submarine =

Émeraude-class submarine may refer to one of the following classes of submarine for the French Navy:

- Émeraude-class submarine (1906) in service 1908–1921
- Émeraude-class submarine (1937)
