= Emerald Sea =

Emerald Sea may refer to:

== Arts and entertainment ==
- Emerald Sea, an 1878 painting by Albert Bierstadt
- The Emerald Sea, a 2018 novel by Richelle Mead
- "The Emerald Sea", from the Anodyne video game soundtrack
- "The Emerald Sea", from the Narcissu video game soundtrack
- "The Emerald Sea", a song by Gary Hughes from the 2007 album Veritas
- Emerald Sea, a 2022 album by Sound of Ceres

== Ships ==
- Emerald Seas, built as USS General W. P. Richardson (AP-118)
- Emerald Sea, owned by McDermott International
- Emerald Sea, an SA-15 type cargo ship

== Other uses ==
- Emerald Sea, the internal development code name for Google+
- Mer d'Émeraude ('Emerald Sea'), a lagoon in Madagascar

== See also ==
- Emerald (disambiguation)
- Sea emerald
