= Emerald Site =

Emerald Site may refer to:

- Emerald site, a site in the Emerald network, a form of nature protection in Europe
- Emerald Mound site, an archaeological site in Mississippi, United States
- Emerald Mound and Village Site, an archaeological site in Illinois, United States

== See also ==
- The Emerald
