= French ship Vendémiaire =

There have been at least three French or Marine Nationale ships bearing the name Vendémiaire, in honour of the month in the French Republican calendar:

- A vessel captured by USS Insurgent in 1799–1800
- French submarine Vendémiaire (Q59), a Pluviôse-class submarine accidentally sunk by the French battleship Saint Louis in 1912
- French submarine Vendémiaire (Q215), a Phénix-class submarine of 1940, subsequently cancelled
- French frigate Vendémiaire (F734), a frégate de surveillance, currently in service.
