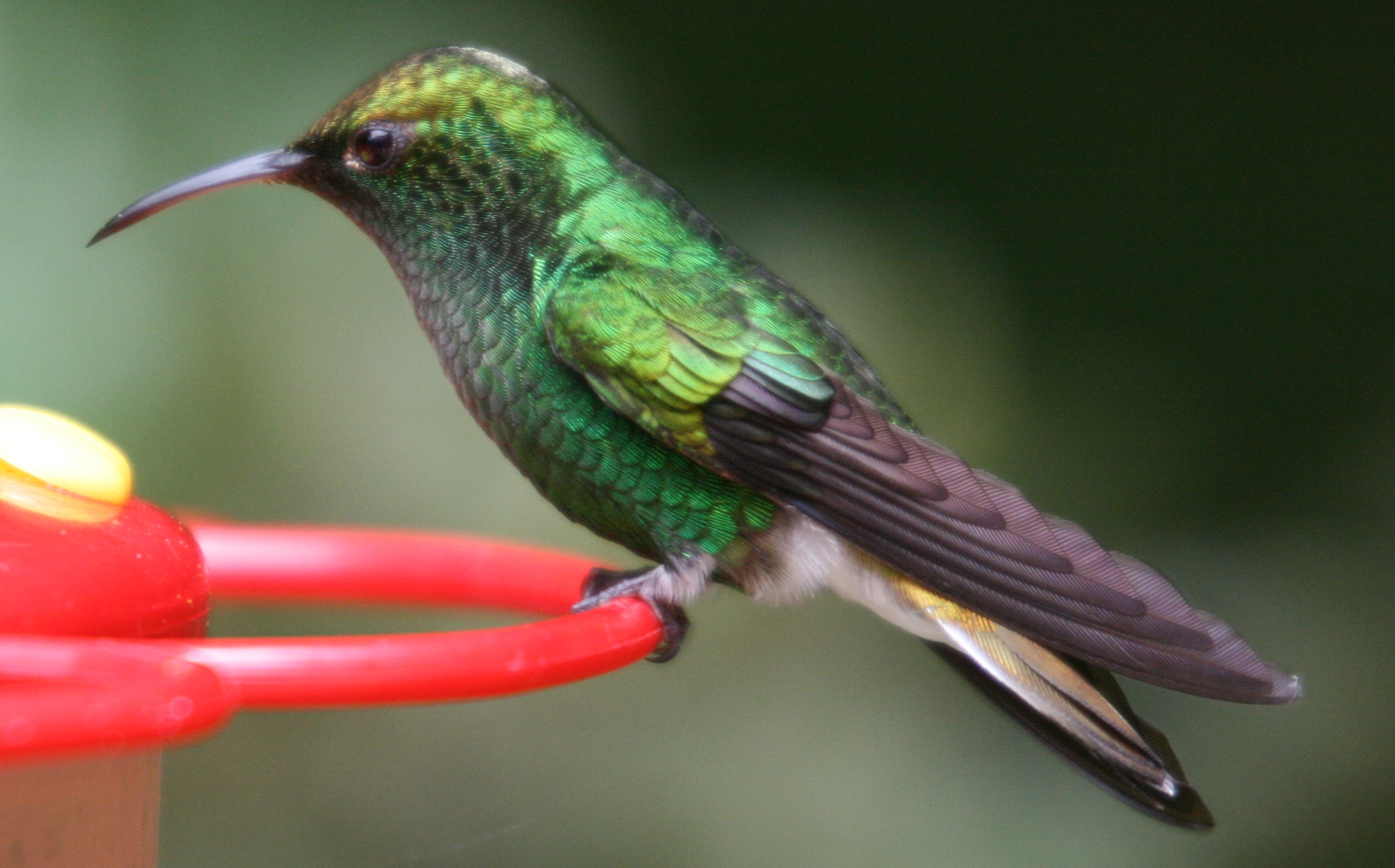

Conservation status
- Least Concern (IUCN 3.1)
- CITES Appendix II

Scientific classification
- Kingdom: Animalia
- Phylum: Chordata
- Class: Aves
- Clade: Strisores
- Order: Apodiformes
- Family: Trochilidae
- Genus: Microchera
- Species: M. cupreiceps

Binomial name
- Microchera cupreiceps (Lawrence, 1866)
- Range of M. cupreiceps

= Coppery-headed emerald =

Species of hummingbird

The coppery-headed emerald (Microchera cupreiceps) is a small hummingbird in the "emeralds", tribe Trochilini of subfamily Trochilinae. It is endemic to Costa Rica.

== Taxonomy and systematics ==
The coppery-headed emerald was formerly placed with the white-tailed emerald (M. chionura) in the genus Elvira. A molecular phylogenetic study published in 2014 found that these two species were closely related to the snowcap in the then-monospecific genus Microchera. The International Ornithological Committee and the Clements taxonomy placed the three species together in Microchera which has priority. However, BirdLife International's Handbook of the Birds of the World retains them in Elvira.

The coppery-tailed emerald is monotypic.

== Description ==
The coppery-headed emerald is about 7.5 cm (3.0 in) long and weighs about 3.0 to 3.3 g (0.11 to 0.12 oz). Both sexes have a moderately decurved bill whose mandible has a pinkish base. The adult male has a dull coppery bronze crown, a bronze green nape, back, and rump, and bright coppery bronze uppertail coverts. Its central pair of tail feathers are bronze, the next three pairs white with pale gray tips, and the outermost pair white with black tips. Its underparts are bright yellowish metallic green with white undertail coverts. Males in the far northern Cordillera de Guanacaste also have a purple spot in the center of the breast. The adult female has metallic green upperparts with bright somewhat coppery bronze uppertail coverts. Its central pair of tail feathers are bright bronze, the next three pairs white with a gray or dusky bar near the end, and the outermost pair white with gray or dusky tips. Its underparts are dull white to grayish white that become white at the vent area; there are also metallic green spots along the flanks. The immature male is similar to the adult but duller and has black tips on all tail feathers except the central pair.

== Distribution and habitat ==
The coppery-headed emerald is found in the highlands of northern and central Costa Rica. In most of its range it is found on the Caribbean slope but in the far north is also found on the Pacific slope. It inhabits the edges and interior of moist to humid montane forest. In the forest interior males are often found in the canopy and females in the understory but both occur at all levels at the edges and in semi-open areas like clearings. In elevation it ranges from 300 to 1,500 m (980 to 4,900 ft) on the Caribbean slope but on the Pacific side is seldom found below about 1,200 m (3,900 ft).

== Behavior ==
=== Movement ===
Following breeding the coppery-headed emerald moves to the lower parts of its elevational range.

=== Feeding ===
The coppery-headed emerald forages for nectar at a wide variety of flowering plants, shrubs, and trees; examples include those of genera Besleria, Cavendishia, Clusia, Guarea, Pithecellobium, Quararibea, Satyria, and Inga. In addition to nectar, it gleans small arthropods from foliage and captures them by hawking from a perch.

=== Breeding ===
The coppery-headed emerald's breeding season extends from October to March and may vary within that window from year to year. Males court females at leks in small groups, singing from a perch and chasing other males. Females construct a small cup nest of plant down and tree fern scales bound with spiderweb with some moss and lichen on the outside. It is typically placed between 1 and 3 m (3 and 10 ft) above the ground in the understory or along an edge. The clutch size is two eggs; the incubation period and time to fledging are not known.

=== Vocalization ===
The coppery-headed emerald's song is a "high, thin, twittering and warbling." Its call has been described as "a high, thin, liquid quip or quit or rapid high sputtering in chases."

== Status ==
The IUCN has assessed the coppery-headed emerald as being of Least Concern. Its population is estimated to be at least 20,000 mature individuals and stable. No immediate threats have been identified. It is considered fairly common and is found in many protected areas.

== Gallery ==
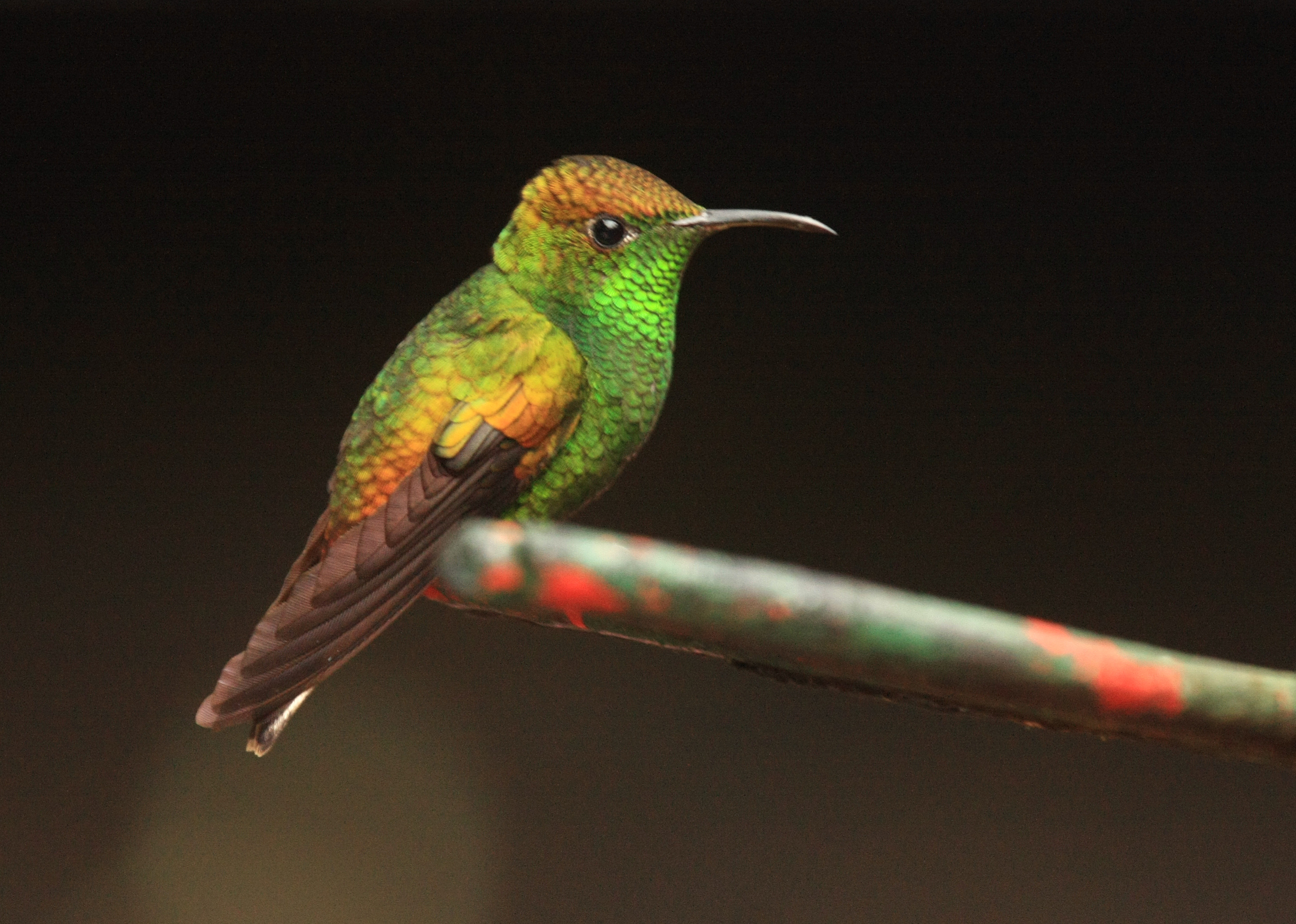
Male

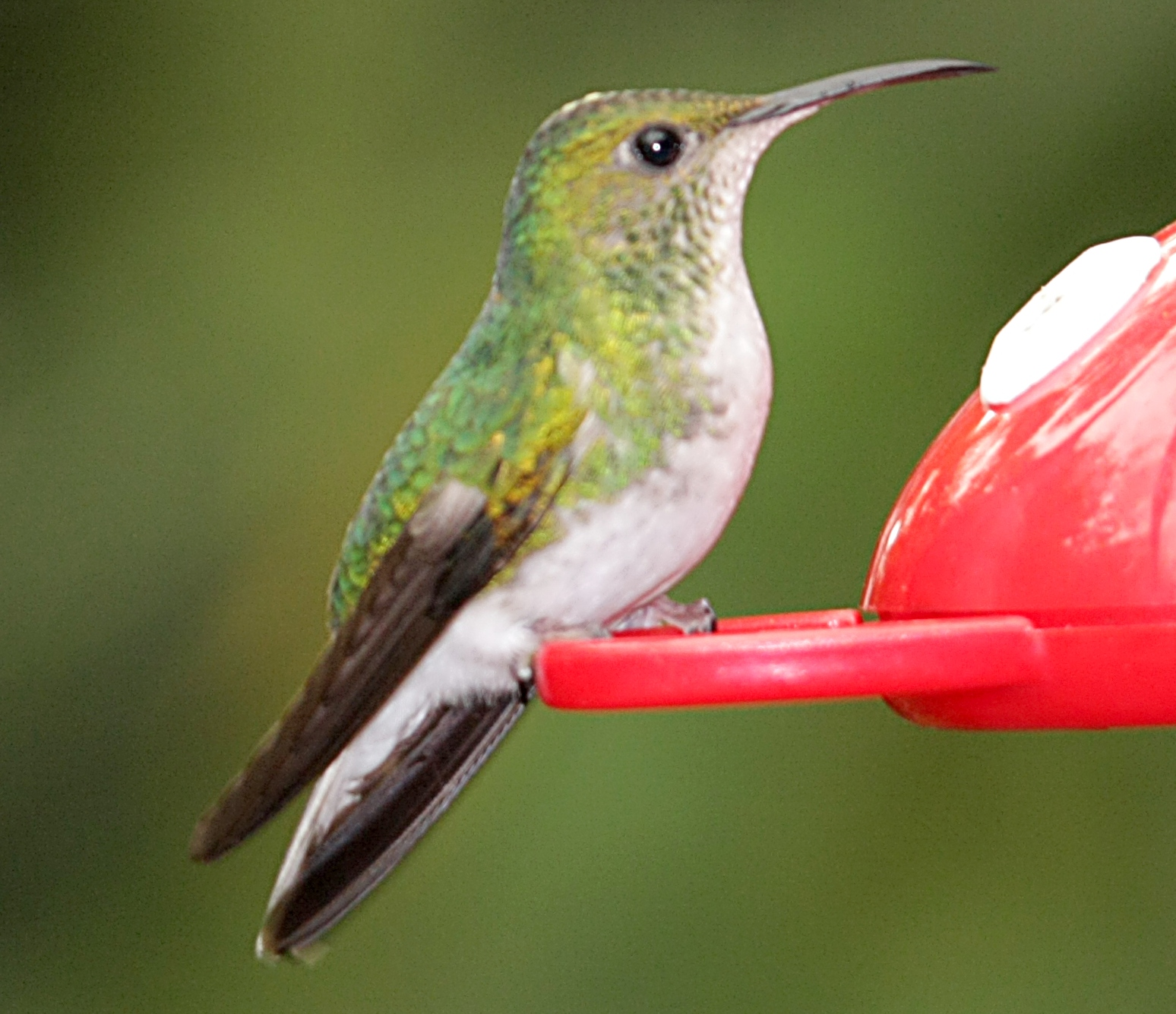
Female near Monteverde

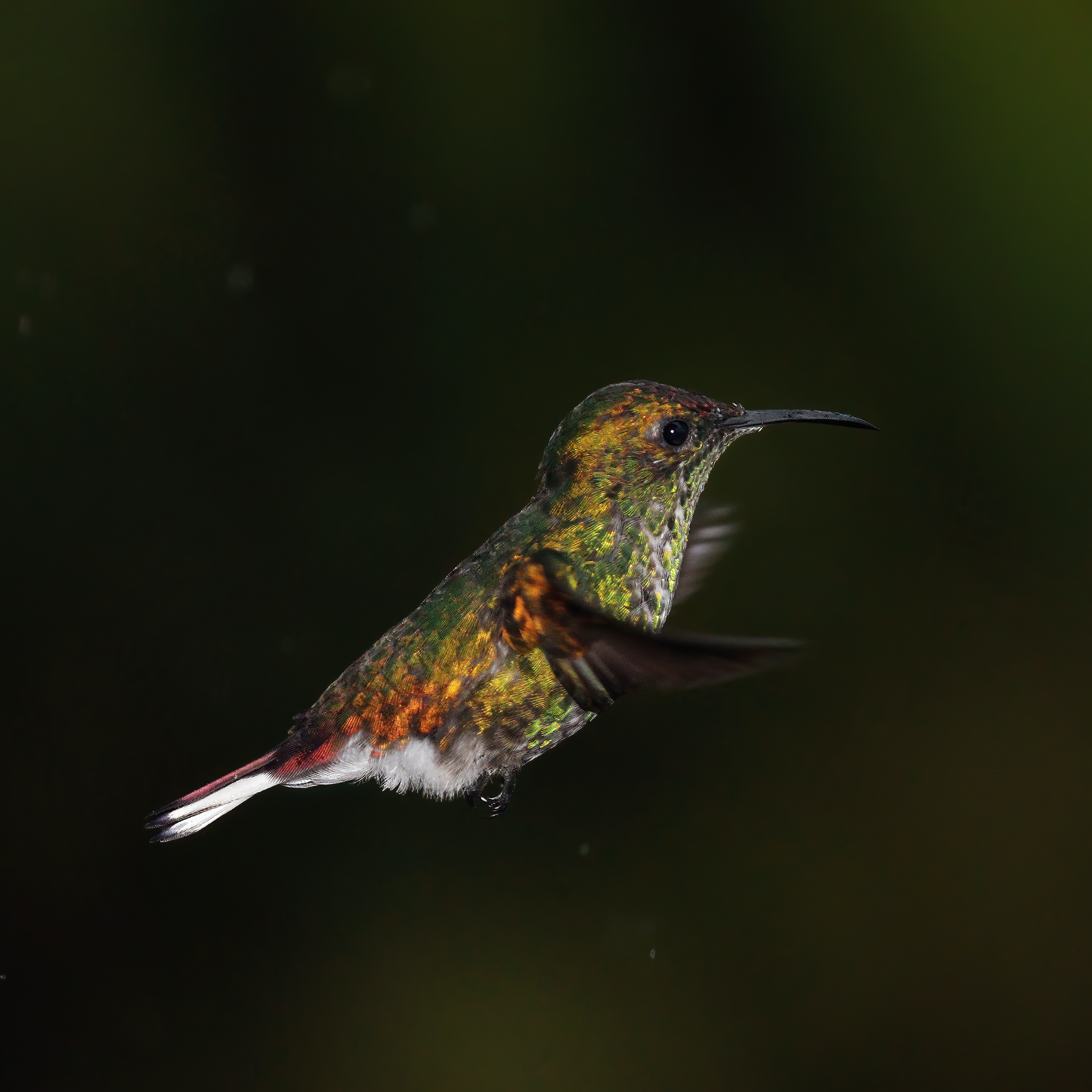
Male in Cinchona
