= Licorice International =

Licorice retailer in the United States

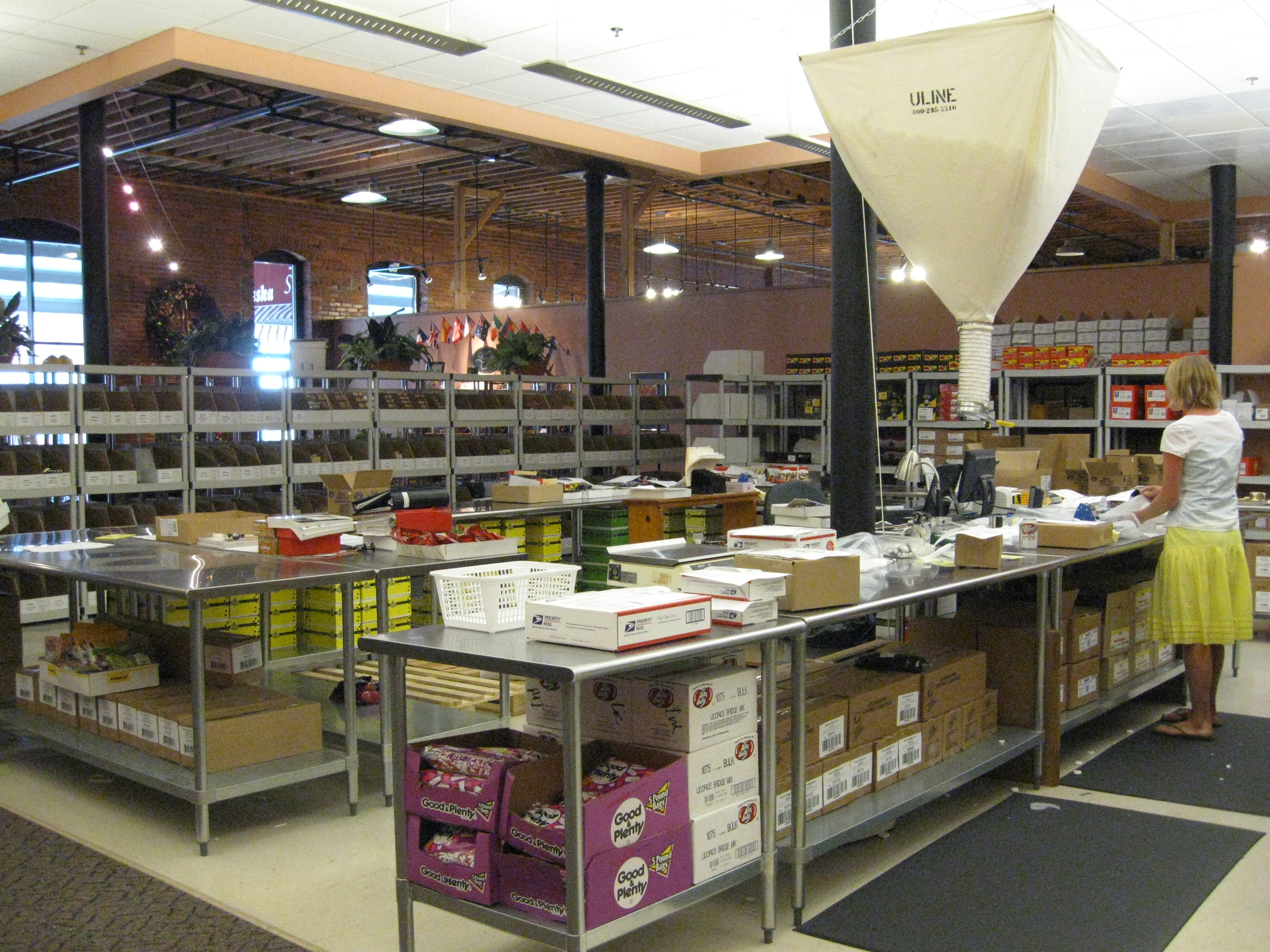
Distribution area of Licorice International

Licorice International is the largest specialty retailer of imported licorice in the United States. The company distributes licorice from 14 countries through its internet site and retail store in Lincoln, Nebraska. and provides a Licorice-of-the-Month Club. .

== Products ==
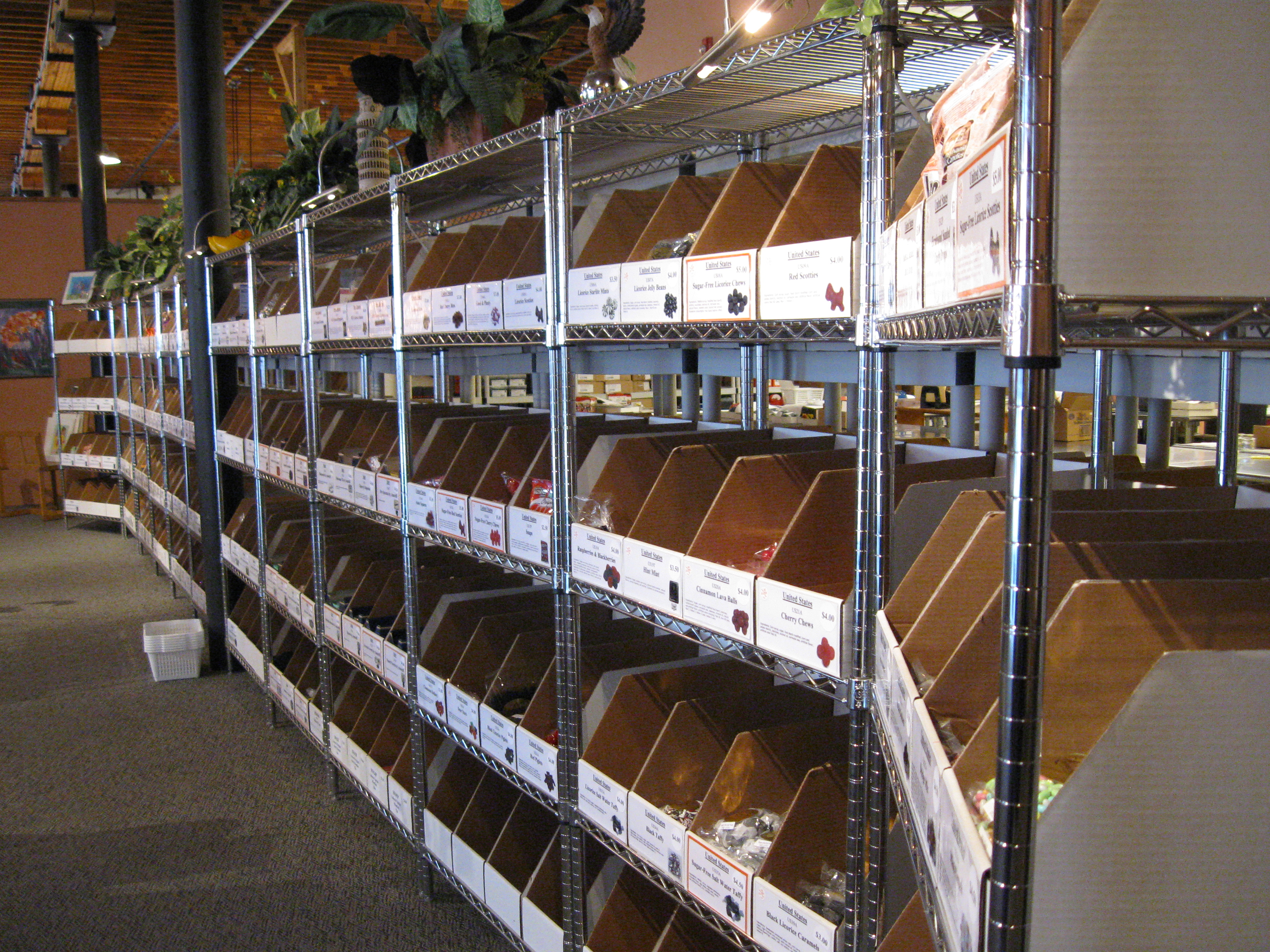
Licorice International's selection of retail products

Licorice International carries nearly 160 types of licorice. Its best sellers include:

- Haribo Black Licorice Wheels
- Leaf Candy Company Black Pipes
- Oatfield (confectionery) Creamy Licorice Toffee
- Katjes Kinder (Cats)
- Kookaburra Black Twists
- Kookaburra Strawberry Twists
- K & H/Gustafs Muntdrops (Coins)
- Haribo Pontefract Cakes
- Gimbal’s Sugar-free Licorice Chews

== History ==
Founded in 1996 by New York resident Larry Ring, the business was purchased in 2002 by Elizabeth Erlandson and Ardith Stuertz of Lincoln, Nebraska. The following year, they opened a retail store in Lincoln’s College View area, and in 2005, they moved the entire operations, including retail and distribution, to its current location at 803 Q Street, in Lincoln’s Historic Haymarket district, increasing their space from 1200 to 4,450 square feet (413 m^{2}) and allowing for group or individual tours.

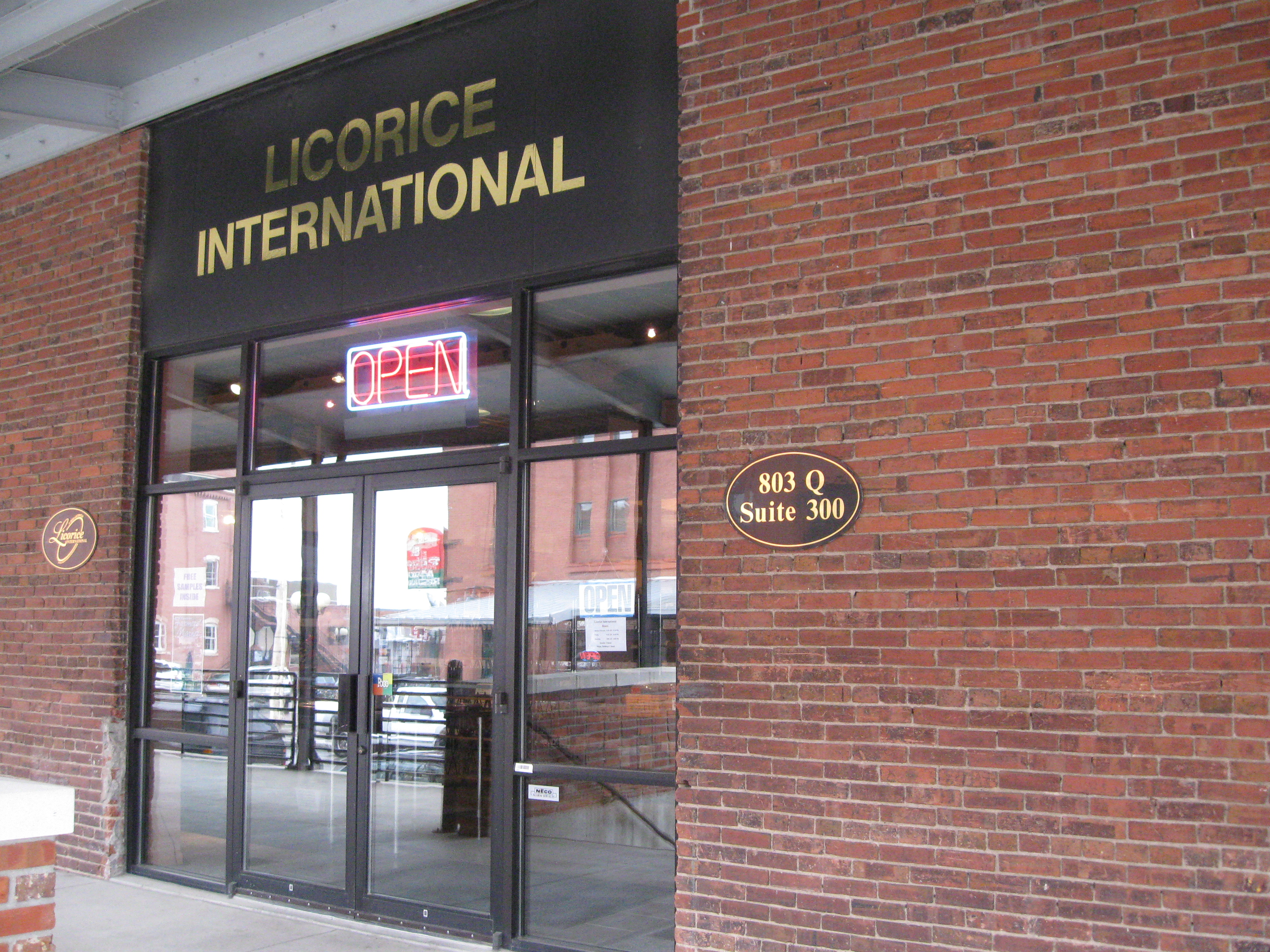
Licorice International's retail store in Lincoln, Nebraska

In 2004, Licorice International founded National Licorice Day, celebrated on April 12. National Licorice Day is listed in Chase’s Calendar of Events and celebrates black licorice, its history, health benefits and world renown.
