= TOPAZ =

TOPAZ may refer to:

- TOPAZ nuclear reactor, a nuclear reactor developed in the Soviet Union
- TOPAZ (think tank), an organisation of the Czech Republic

== See also ==
- Topaz (disambiguation)
