= Émeraude =

Émeraude or emeraude is the French word for emerald and may refer to:

- Emeraude Toubia, American actress
- Emeraude (rocket), a French rocket system of the 1960s
- French ship Émeraude, several French Naval ships
- Piel Emeraude, French aircraft
- Mitsubishi Emeraude, variant of the Mitsubishi Galant
- A perfume marketed by Coty

== Fictional characters ==
- Emeraude, character in the Magic Knight Rayearth anime and manga series
- Emeraude, character in the Tales of Graces action role-playing game

== See also ==
- Emerald (disambiguation)
