= Topaze =

Topaze may refer to:

- Topaze (play), a 1928 French play written by Marcel Pagnol, which spawned a number of film adaptations:
  - Topaze (1933 American film), starring John Barrymore and Myrna Loy
  - Topaze (1933 French film), featuring Louis Jouvet and Simone Héliard
  - Topaze (1936 film), directed by Pagnol
  - Topaze (1951 film), also directed by Pagnol
  - Topaze (Playhouse 90), a 1957 American television play adaptation
  - Topaze (Wednesday Theatre), a 1966 Australian television play adaptation
  - Mr. Topaze, a 1961 film starring Peter Sellers
- HMS Topaze, the name of four Royal Navy ships
- French ship Topaze, the name of nine ships of the French Navy
- Topaze (rocket), a French rocket
- Topaze (magazine), a Chilean magazine of political satiree published from 1931 to 1970

== See also ==
- Topaz (disambiguation)
