= Q44 =

Q44 may refer to:

- Q44 (New York City bus)
- Ad-Dukhan, a surah of the Quran
- French submarine Saphir (Q44)
