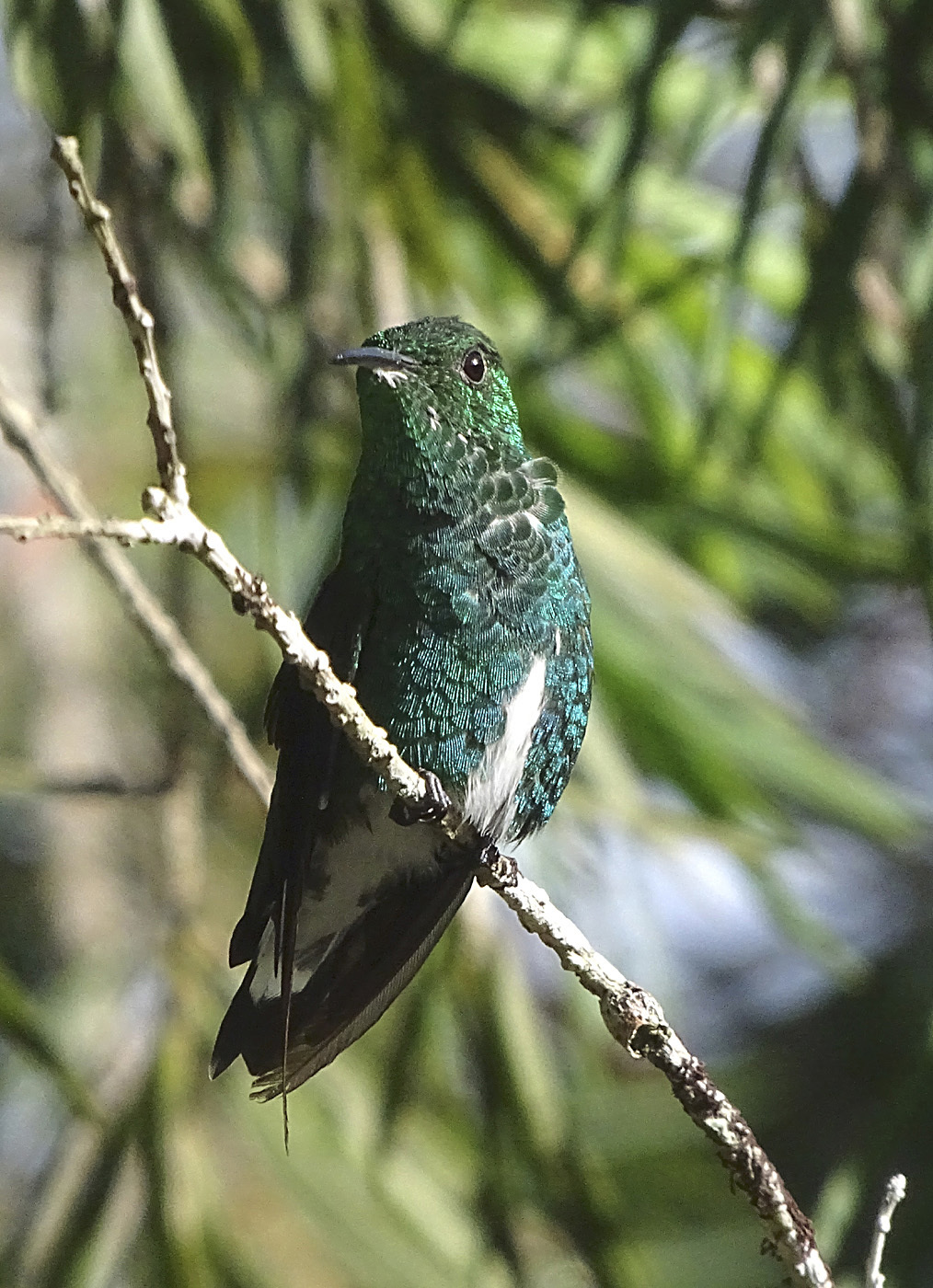

Conservation status
- Least Concern (IUCN 3.1)
- CITES Appendix II

Scientific classification
- Kingdom: Animalia
- Phylum: Chordata
- Class: Aves
- Order: Apodiformes
- Family: Trochilidae
- Genus: Microchera
- Species: M. chionura

Binomial name
- Microchera chionura (Gould, 1851)

= White-tailed emerald =

Species of hummingbird

The white-tailed emerald (Microchera chionura) is a species of hummingbird in the "emeralds", tribe Trochilini of subfamily Trochilinae. It is native to the Talamancan montane forests.

== Taxonomy and systematics ==
The white-tailed emerald was formerly placed with the coppery-headed emerald in the genus Elvira. A molecular phylogenetic study published in 2014 found that these two species were closely related to the snowcap in the then-monospecific genus Microchera. The International Ornithological Committee and the Clements taxonomy placed the three species together in Microchera which has priority. However, BirdLife International's Handbook of the Birds of the World retains them in Elvira.

The white-tailed emerald is monotypic.

== Description ==
The white-tailed emerald is 7.5 to 8 cm (3.0 to 3.1 in) long. Males weigh about 3.3 g (0.12 oz) and females 3.1 g (0.11 oz). Both sexes have an almost straight black bill whose mandible has a pinkish base. The adult male has bronzy green upperparts that becomes dark copper-bronze on the uppertail coverts. Its central two pairs of tail feathers are copper-bronze and the other three pairs white with black tips. It has a glittering green throat and chest and white belly, vent, and undertail coverts. The adult female also has bronzy green upperparts. Its central two pairs of tail feathers are bronzy and the other three pairs white with a black band near the tip. Its underparts are dull white with bronzy green flanks. The immature male is similar to the adult but with duller underparts that have grayish buff fringes to the feathers. Immature females have grayer underparts than the adult.

== Distribution and habitat ==
The white-tailed emerald is found in the highlands of the Pacific slope from south-central Costa Rica to central Panama and also locally on the Caribbean slope in Panama. It inhabits the edges and interior of moist to humid montane forest and secondary forest, and also plantations and gardens. In the forest interior males are often found in the canopy and females in the understory. In elevation it ranges from 750 to 2,000 m (2,500 to 6,600 ft) but in Costa Rica breeds mostly between 1,000 and 1,700 m (3,300 and 5,600 ft).

== Behavior ==
=== Movement ===
The white-tailed emerald's movements are not fully understood. In Costa Rica some individuals move both upslope and down outside the breeding season.

=== Feeding ===
The white-tailed emerald feeds on nectar from a variety of flowering plants at both the edges and interior of the forest. In addition to nectar, it captures small arthropods by hawking from a perch.

=== Breeding ===
The white-tailed emerald's breeding season extends from June to November. Males court females at leks in small groups. Nothing else is known about the species' breeding phenology and its nest has not been described.

=== Vocalization ===
The white-tailed emerald's song is "a prolonged, thin scratchy twittering mixed with buzzing or gurgling notes". It also makes "soft scratchy chipping notes" when foraging and "high-pitched, buzzy notes" when chasing.

== Status ==
The IUCN has assessed the white-tailed emerald as being of Least Concern. Its population is estimated to be at least 20,000 mature individuals and stable. No immediate threats have been identified. It is considered locally common in some protected areas, but "deforestation [is] extensive and continuing in at least the lower part of its altitudinal range".
