= French submarine Phénix =

French submarine Phénix may refer to:

- French submarine Phénix (Q157), a Redoutable-class submarine operated between 1932 and 1939
- French submarine Phénix (Q227), lead boat of the Phénix-class submarine cancelled in 1940
