= Q42 =

Q42 may refer to:

== People ==
- Douglas Adams, English author whose Wikidata item is Q42.

== Vessels ==
- ARA Cabo San Antonio (Q-42), a tank landing ship of the Argentine Navy
- French submarine Opale
- Al-Rasikh, a Khareef-class corvette of the Royal Navy of Oman

== Other uses ==
- Q42 (New York City bus)
- Ash-Shura, the 42nd surah of the Quran
