= French ship Topaze =

Nine ships of the French Navy have borne the name Topaze, in honour of the gemstone Topaz:

- French frigate Topaze (1750), a 26-gun frigate, lead ship of her class
- French frigate Topaze (1790), a 32-gun Magicienne-class frigate
- French frigate Topaze (1805), a 44-gun frigate
- French schooner Topaze (1823), a 2-carronade Émeraude-class schooner
- French schooner Topaze (1844), a 6-gun schooner
- French schooner Topaze (1870), a 2-gun schooner
- French aviso Topaze (1891), a 6-gun Opale-class aviso
- French submarine Topaze (1910), an Émeraude-class submarine
- French ship Topaze (1917), an auxiliary ship
