= Oatfield =

Oatfield may refer to:

- Oatfield (confectioner), originating in Letterkenny, County Donegal
- Oatfield, Oregon, a census-designated place in the U.S. state of Oregon
