= Topaz (comics) =

Topaz, in comics may refer to:

- Topaz (Marvel Comics), a Marvel Comics sorceress

== See also ==
- Topaz (disambiguation)
