= The Emerald =

The Emerald may refer to:

- SS The Emerald, American cruise ship built in 1958 and retired in 2009
- The Emerald (building), a skyscraper in Seattle built in 2020

== See also ==
- Emerald (disambiguation)
