= Emerald Records =

Emerald Records has been the name of at least two different record labels in the 20th century:

- Emerald Records (1966), a US-based company
- Emerald Records (2000s), a US-based company

== See also ==
- List of record labels
