= French submarine Turquoise (1908) =

Submarine of the French Navy

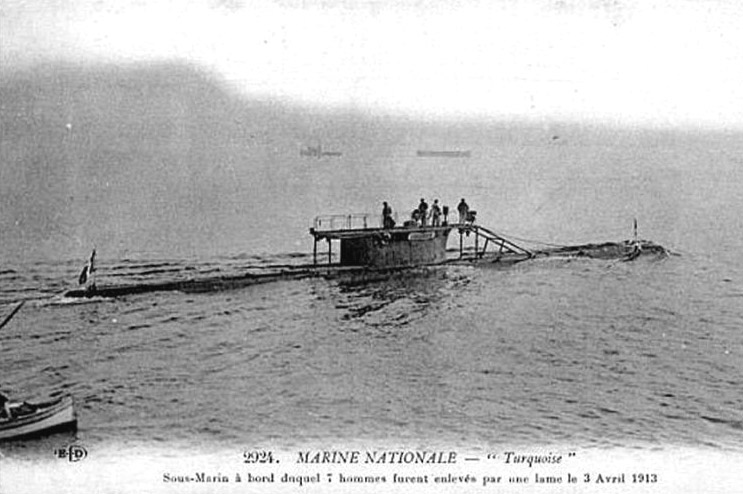
- A French postcard of Turquoise on the surface, 3 April 1913

History

France
- Name: Turquoise
- Namesake: Turquoise
- Builder: Arsenal de Toulon
- Laid down: October 1903
- Launched: 3 August 1908
- Completed: 10 December 1910
- Identification: Pennant number: Q46
- Captured: Salvaged by the Ottoman Navy, 3 November 1915
- Fate: Direct hit piercing periscope prevent evasion and diving eventually captured, 30 October 1915

Ottoman Empire
- Name: Müstecip Onbaşı
- Acquired: 3 November 1915

General characteristics
- Class & type: Émeraude-class submarine
- Displacement: 395 t (389 long tons) (surfaced); 427 t (420 long tons) (submerged)
- Length: 44.9 m (147 ft 4 in) (o/a)
- Beam: 3.9 m (12 ft 10 in)
- Draft: 3.77 m (12 ft 4 in)
- Installed power: 600 PS (440 kW; 590 bhp) (diesel engines); 600 PS (electric motors)
- Propulsion: 2 × shafts; 2 × diesels; 2 × electric motors
- Speed: 11.26 knots (20.85 km/h; 12.96 mph) (surfaced); 8.7 knots (16.1 km/h; 10.0 mph) (submerged)
- Range: 2,000 nmi (3,700 km; 2,300 mi) at 7.3 knots (13.5 km/h; 8.4 mph) (surfaced); 100 nmi (190 km; 120 mi) at 5 knots (9.3 km/h; 5.8 mph) (submerged)
- Test depth: 40 m (130 ft)
- Complement: 2 officers and 23 crewmen
- Armament: 4 × 450 mm (17.7 in) torpedo tubes (2 × bow, 2 × stern)

Turquoise was one of six Émeraude-class submarines built for the French Navy (Marine Nationale) in the first decade of the 20th century. During the First World War, she was captured by the Ottoman forces in late 1915 and served with the Ottoman Navy until 1918.

== Design and description ==
The Émeraude class were built as part of the French Navy's 1903 building program to a Maugas single-hull design. The submarines displaced 395 metric tons (389 long tons) surfaced and 427 metric tons (420 long tons) submerged. They had an overall length of 44.9 meters (147 ft 4 in), a beam of 3.9 meters (12 ft 10 in), and a draft of 3.8 meters (12 ft 6 in). They had an operational diving depth of 40 meters (130 ft). Their crew numbered 2 officers and 23 enlisted men.

For surface running, the boats were powered by two Sautter-Harlé 300-metric-horsepower (296 bhp; 221 kW) diesel engines, each driving one propeller shaft. When submerged each propeller was driven by a 300-metric-horsepower electric motor. They could reach a maximum speed of 11.26 knots (20.85 km/h; 12.96 mph) on the surface and 8.5 knots (15.7 km/h; 9.8 mph) underwater. The Émeraude class had a surface endurance of 2,000 nautical miles (3,700 km; 2,300 mi) at 7.3 knots (13.5 km/h; 8.4 mph) and a submerged endurance of 100 nmi (190 km; 120 mi) at 5 knots (9.3 km/h; 5.8 mph).

The boats were armed with four internal 450-millimeter (17.7 in) torpedo tubes, two in the bow and two in the stern, for which they carried six torpedoes. Turquoise and her sister Topaze were the first French submarines to be equipped with a deck gun when they were fitted with a single 37-millimeter (1.5 in) gun in August 1915.

== Construction and career ==
Turquoise was laid down in October 1903 at the Arsenal de Toulon, launched on 3 August 1908 and commissioned on 10 December 1910.

During World War I, Turquoise received a direct hit to her periscope in the Dardanelles off Nagara Point, Ottoman Empire, on 30 October 1915 by an artillery corporal named Müstecip while traveling on the surface. The crew was forced to surrender. She was repaired by Ottoman forces on 3 November 1915 and taken into the Ottoman Navy as Müstecip Onbaşı, and returned in 1918.

== Bibliography ==
- Borton, Donald E.; Griffith, Frank G.; Kemp, Paul J.; Layman, R. D. & Rich, North (1988). "Question 19/87". Warship International. XXV (2): 210–212. ISSN 0043-0374.
- Caruana, Joseph (1989). "Question 19/87". Warship International. XXVI (2): 206. ISSN 0043-0374.
- Couhat, Jean Labayle (1974). French Warships of World War I. London: Ian Allan. ISBN 0-7110-0445-5.
- Gardiner, Robert & Gray, Randal (1985). Conway's All The World's Fighting Ships 1906–1921. London: Conway Maritime Press. ISBN 0-85177-245-5.
- Garier, Gérard (2002). A l'épreuve de la Grande Guerre. L'odyssée technique et humaine du sous-marin en France (in French). Vol. 3–2. Bourg-en-Bresse, France: Marines édition. ISBN 2-909675-81-5.
- Garier, Gérard (1998). Des Émeraude (1905-1906) au Charles Brun (1908–1933). L'odyssée technique et humaine du sous-marin en France (in French). Vol. 2. Bourg-en-Bresse, France: Marines édition. ISBN 2-909675-34-3.
