= Oatfield Emerald =

Type of chocolate toffee sweet

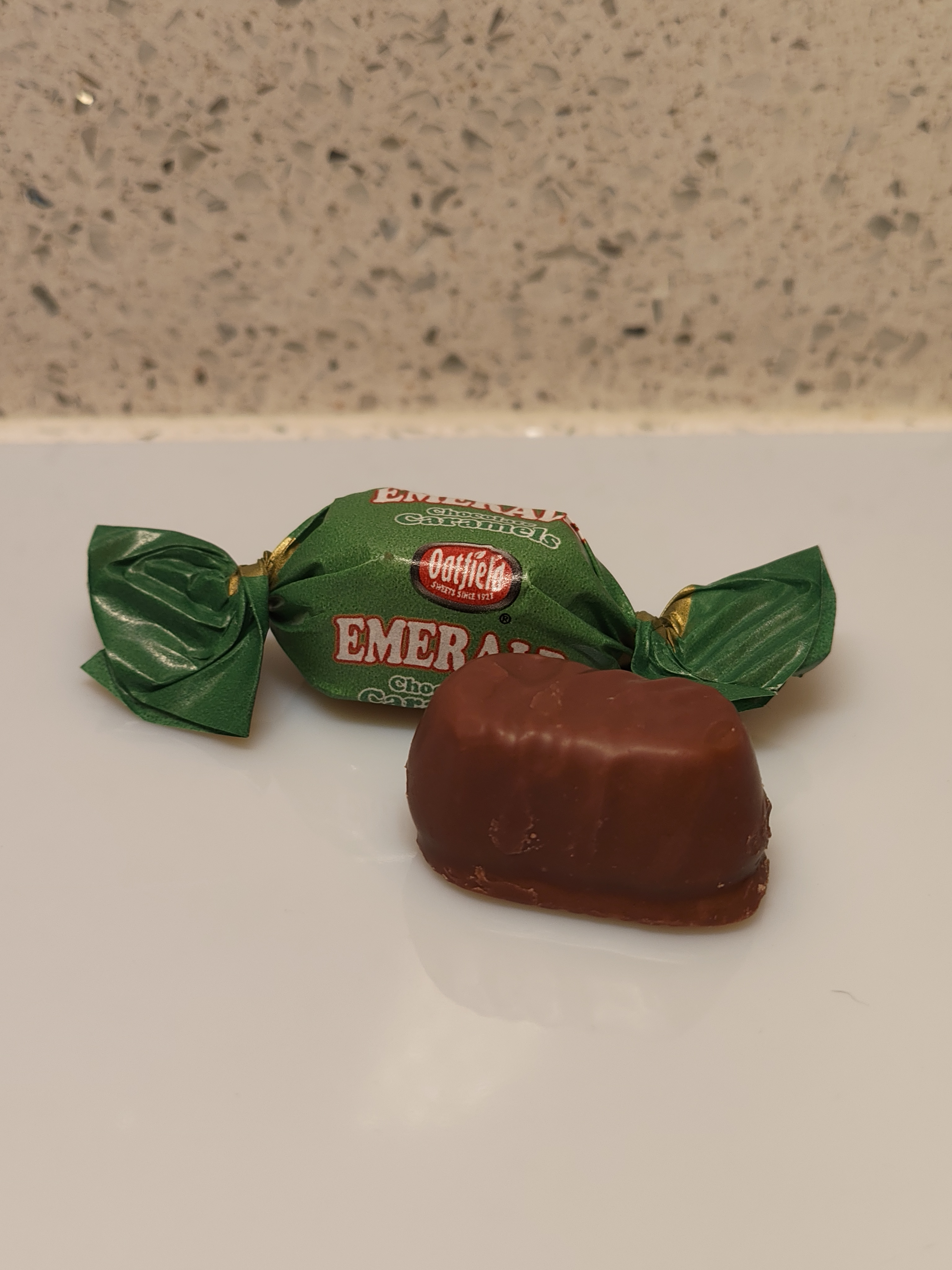
Oatfield Emerald, one wrapped and one unwrapped

The Oatfield Emerald is a type of chocolate toffee sweet native to Ireland and is considered one of the country's most popular sweets and one of the "iconic names of the Irish sweet world" with a distinctive green wrapper.

== History ==
The Oatfield Emerald has been produced since the mid-twentieth century by Oatfield and exported worldwide. Up until the late 2000s, the Emerald was Oatfield's biggest seller.

Production moved out of the Republic of Ireland (and the original factory) in 2012, and was moved to England by the new company owners, Zed Candy.

== Ingredients ==
Milk chocolate filled with caramel and coconut. Ingredients Glucose Syrup, Sugar, Milk Chocolate (19%), [Sugar, Cocoa Mass, Cocoa Butter, Whole Milk Powder, Skimmed Milk Powder, Emulsifier: Soya Lecithins], Vegetable Fat [Palm], Condensed Skimmed Milk, Shredded Coconut (4%), Flavour, Emulsifiers [Mono and Diglycerides of Fatty Acids, Soya Lecithins].
