= Fairchild (mango) =

Type of fruit

Mangifera 'Fairchild'
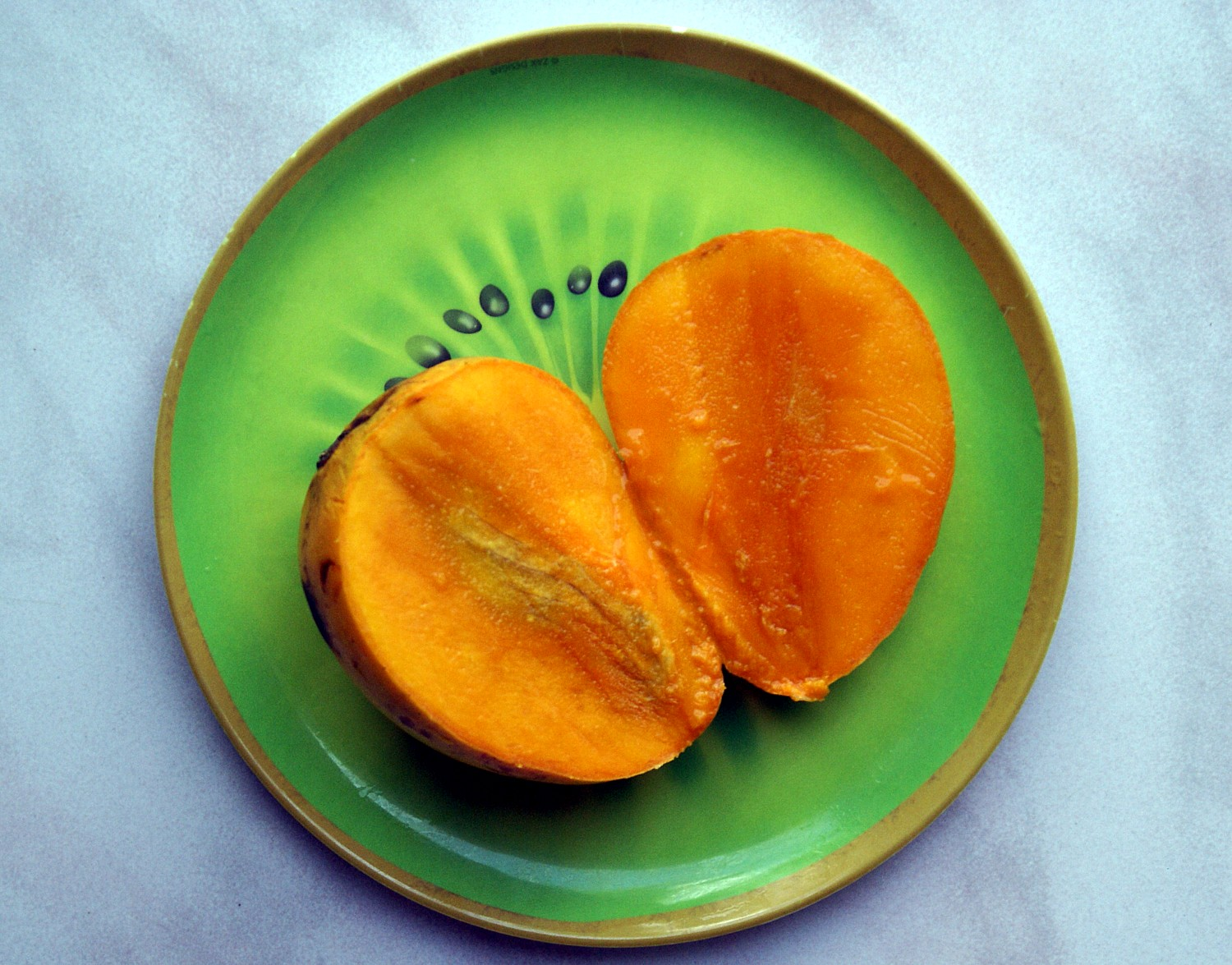
- Genus: Mangifera
- Species: Mangifera indica
- Cultivar: 'Fairchild'
- Breeder: David Fairchild
- Origin: Panama

The 'Fairchild' mango is a commercially grown mango cultivar originating in Panama. The 'Fairchild Emerald' mango is a named mango cultivar that originated in southwest Florida.

== History ==
Little is known about the history of the variety, other than that it originated in the Panama Canal Zone during the early 1900s. The fruit was named after the family of Dr. David Fairchild, who had taken a liking to the variety. It was first brought to the United States through Hawaii in 1926, then introduced to Florida in 1936 by Dr. David Fairchild. While it grew in popularity in Hawaii, specimens in Florida collections were lost over time and it was not re-introduced to the state until 1992 by Dr. Carl Campbell, who brought Fairchild to the Fairchild Tropical Botanic Garden in Coral Gables, Florida from Honduras.

The characteristics of the Fairchild mango suggest it is of Indo-Chinese origin, however the fruit contains a monoembryonic seed, which is unusual for mangoes from that line. This suggests that the Fairchild is possibly some sort of hybrid of Indo-Chinese and Indian cultivars.

== Description ==
Fairchild is grown on a limited commercial basis in Hawaii and Panama, and has seen some commercial plantings in Florida as well. While the fruit lacks the color desired of some major commercial mango cultivars such as Tommy Atkins, it possesses qualities that give it potential for wider commercial adaptation. These include flavor, excellent production, and very good disease resistance.

Today, Fairchild trees are planted in the collections of the USDA's germplasm repository in Miami, and the Miami-Dade Fruit and Spice Park in Homestead, Florida.

=== Fruit ===
The fruit is small, typically less than a pound in weight, with an oblong-ovoid shape and lacking any beak. The fruit ripens to yellow from green, and lacks any red blush. It has dark yellow and juicy flesh, which is fiberless and has a rich and aromatic flavor and contains a monoembryonic seed. It usually ripens from June to July in Florida.

=== Tree ===
While the tree tends to be a vigorous grower it can be maintained at under 8 feet in height, leading to its characterization as a "condo mango".

== Fairchild Emerald ==
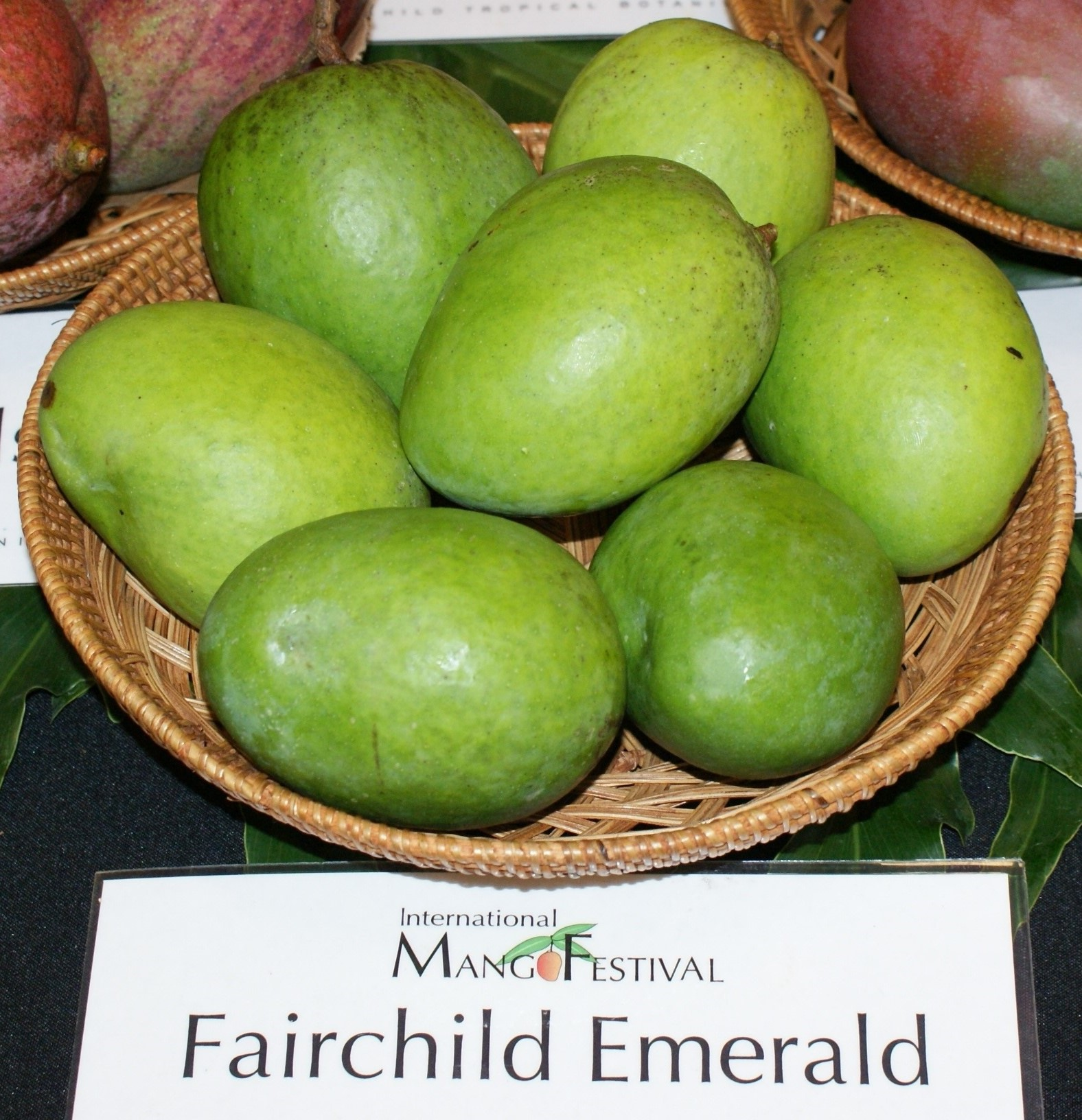

Emerald was selected in Pine Island, Florida due to its excellent eating qualities and heavy production. It was named a Curator's Choice mango for the 2010 mango festival at Fairchild Tropical Botanic Garden.

The fruit is an emerald-green color at maturity, sometimes developing a crimson blush when exposed to sun, averaging less than a pound in weight. The flesh is orange, fiberless, and has a rich flavour.

== See also ==
- List of mango cultivars
