= Emerald City (disambiguation) =

The Emerald City is the capital city of the fictional Land of Oz in L. Frank Baum's Oz books and in the 1939 film adaptation The Wizard of Oz.

Emerald City may also refer to:

== Places nicknamed "Emerald City" ==
=== United States ===
- Seattle, Washington
- Los Angeles in the 1920s, California
- Dublin, Georgia
- Eugene, Oregon
- Greenville, North Carolina
- Greenwood, South Carolina

=== Elsewhere ===
- Sydney, Australia
- Esmeraldas, Ecuador
- Green Zone, International Zone of Baghdad, Iraq
- Muntinlupa, Philippines

== Arts, entertainment, and media ==
=== Music ===
- Emerald City (Teena Marie album), released in 1986
- Emerald City (John Abercrombie and Richie Beirach album), released in 1987
- Emerald City (John Vanderslice album), released in 2007
- The Emerald City (Melanie Doane album), released in 2011
- The Emerald City, by The Tossers, released in 2013
- "Emerald City" (song), recorded as a single in 1967 by The Seekers
- "Emerald City", a song by Prodigal from the 1984 album Electric Eye
- "Emerald City", a song by Dramarama from the 1985 album Cinéma Vérité

=== Television ===
- Emerald City (TV series), a 2017 American fantasy television series on NBC based on L. Frank Baum's Oz series
- The Emerald City (1976-1979), LGBTQ television series that aired on Channel J
- "The Emerald City" (Boardwalk Empire), a season 1 episode of the television series Boardwalk Empire (2010)

=== Other arts, entertainment, and media ===
- Emerald City (play), a 1987 satirical play by David Williamson about the Australian film industry
- Emerald City (film), a 1988 Australian film starring Nicole Kidman, adapted from David Williamson's play
- Emerald City (magazine), a science fiction fanzine published from 1995 to 2006
- Emerald City, a prison unit in the fictional Oswald Maximum Security Prison of HBO's Oz television series (1997–2003)
- Emerald City Comicon, an annual comic book convention in Seattle, Washington, U.S.

== Enterprises and organizations nicknamed "Emerald City" ==
- Emerald City, former theme of the MGM Grand Las Vegas hotel and casino in Las Vegas, Nevada, U.S.
- Foxwoods Resort Casino, in Connecticut, U.S.
- Oracle Corporation headquarters in Redwood Shores, California, U.S.
- Washington, D.C. Temple of the Church of Jesus Christ of Latter-day Saints in Kensington, Maryland, U.S.

== See also ==
- The Emerald City of Oz (1910), the sixth book in L. Frank Baum's Oz series
