= Émeraude-class submarine (1937) =

Class overview
- Name: Émeraude class
- Operators: French Navy
- Preceded by: Roland Morillot class
- Succeeded by: Phénix class
- Planned: 4
- Completed: 0

General characteristics
- Type: Minelaying submarine
- Displacement: 862 t (848 long tons) (surfaced); 1,119 t (1,101 long tons) (submerged)
- Length: 72.7 m (238 ft 6 in) (o/a)
- Beam: 7.36 m (24 ft 2 in)
- Draft: 4.1 m (13 ft 5 in)
- Installed power: 2,000 bhp (1,500 kW) (diesels); 1,270 shp (950 kW) (electric motors)
- Propulsion: 2 × shafts; 2 × diesel engines; 2 × electric motors
- Speed: 15 knots (28 km/h; 17 mph) (surfaced); 9 knots (17 km/h; 10 mph) (submerged)
- Range: 5,600 nmi (10,400 km; 6,400 mi) at 12 knots (22 km/h; 14 mph) surfaced; 90 nmi (170 km; 100 mi) at 4 knots (7.4 km/h; 4.6 mph) submerged
- Complement: 43
- Armament: 4 × 550 mm (21.7 in) torpedo tubes; 1 × 100 mm (3.9 in) deck gun; 2 × 13.2 mm (0.52 in) machine guns; 40 mines

The Émeraude-class submarines were a quartet of four minelaying submarines that were ordered for the French Navy during the 1930s. Only the name boat was laid down before the German invasion of France on 10 May 1940 and she was demolished before she could be launched.

== Ships ==
Ship	Laid down	Launched	Fate
Émeraude (Q197)			Demolished on the slipway, 23 June 1940
Agate (Q208)			Cancelled, 1940
Corail (Q209)			Cancelled, 1940
Escarboucle (Q210)			Cancelled, 1940

== Bibliography ==
- Gardiner, Robert & Chesneau, Roger, eds. (1980). Conway's All the World's Fighting Ships 1922–1946. London: Conway Maritime Press. ISBN 0-85177-146-7.
