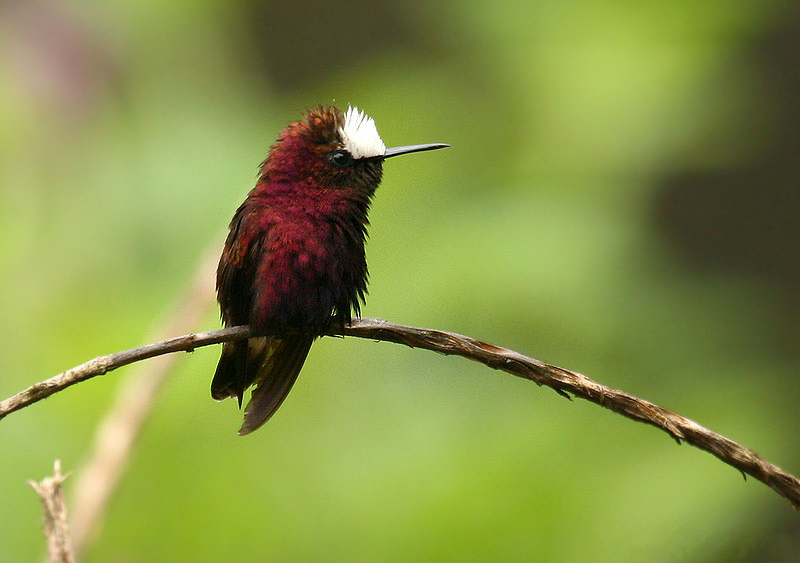
- Snowcap (Microchera albocoronata)

Scientific classification
- Kingdom: Animalia
- Phylum: Chordata
- Class: Aves
- Order: Apodiformes
- Family: Trochilidae
- Tribe: Trochilini
- Genus: Microchera; Gould, 1858

Type species
- Mellisuga albocoronata Lawrence, 1855

Species
- 3, see text

= Microchera =

Genus of birds

Microchera is a genus of hummingbirds.

== Species ==
The genus includes three species:

Genus Microchera – Gould, 1858 – three species
Common name	Scientific name and subspecies	Range	Size and ecology	IUCN status and estimated population
Snowcap Male Female	Microchera albocoronata (Lawrence, 1855) Two subspecies: M. a. albocoronata; (Lawrence, 1855); M. a. parvirostris; (Lawrence, 1865)	Costa Rica, Honduras, Nicaragua, and Panama	Size: Habitat: Diet:	LC
Coppery-headed emerald Male Female	Microchera cupreiceps (Lawrence, 1866)	Costa Rica	Size: Habitat: Diet:	LC
White-tailed emerald	Microchera chionura (Gould, 1851)	Costa Rica and Panama.	Size: Habitat: Diet:	LC

The white-tailed emerald and the coppery-headed emerald were formerly placed in the genus Elvira. A molecular phylogenetic study published in 2014 found that these two species were closely related to the snowcap in the genus Microchera. The three species were therefore placed together in Microchera which has priority.
