= USS Emerald =

USS Emerald has been the name of more than one United States Navy ship, and may refer to:

- USS Emerald (1864), a ferry boat in service from 1864 and 1883
- USS Emerald (SP-177), a patrol vessel in service from 1917 to 1918
- USS Emerald (PYc-1), a coastal minesweeper in commission from 1940 to 1942
