= Emerald (band) =

Swiss metal band

Emerald is a Swiss heavy metal band. They have released eight albums.

The band signed with Shark Records in 2002, then released their material through Pure Steel Records for several years before finding a new label in Rock of Angels Records in 2019.

== Discography ==
- Rebels of Our Time (1999)
- Calling the Knights (2001)
- Forces of Doom (2004)
- Hymns to Steel (2007)
- Re-Forged (2010)
- Unleashed (2012)
- Reckoning Day (2017)
- Restless Souls (2019)
