= French submarine Topaze =

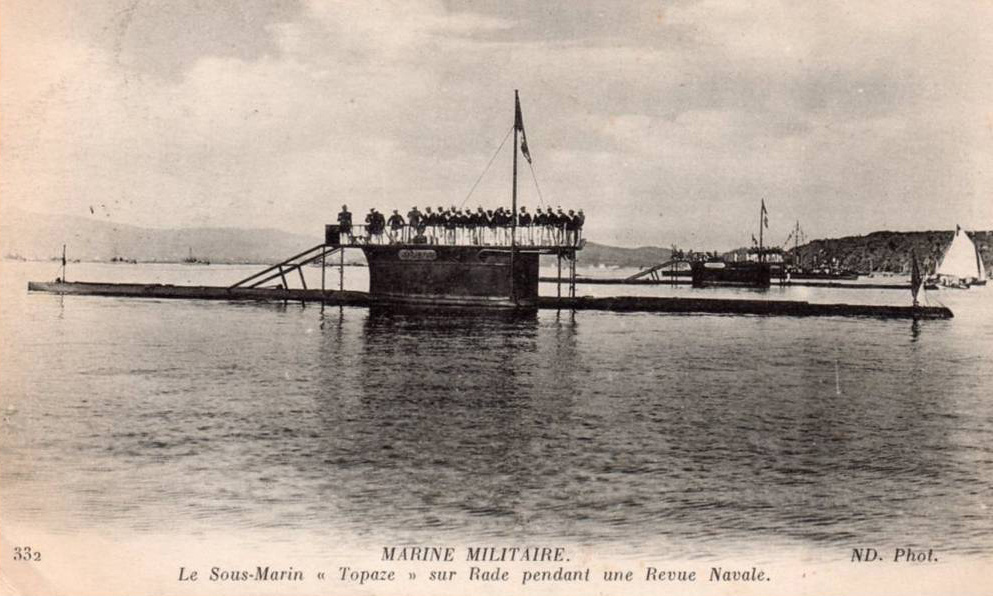
- A French postcard of Topaze in Toulon during a naval review

History

France
- Name: Topaze
- Namesake: Topaz
- Builder: Arsenal de Toulon
- Laid down: October 1903
- Launched: 2 July 1908
- Completed: 10 December 1910
- Stricken: 12 November 1919
- Identification: Pennant number: Q45
- Fate: Sold for scrap, 10 May 1921

General characteristics
- Class & type: Émeraude-class submarine
- Displacement: 395 t (389 long tons) (surfaced); 427 t (420 long tons) (submerged)
- Length: 44.9 m (147 ft 4 in) (o/a)
- Beam: 3.9 m (12 ft 10 in)
- Draft: 3.77 m (12 ft 4 in)
- Installed power: 600 PS (440 kW; 590 bhp) (diesel engines); 600 PS (electric motors)
- Propulsion: 2 × shafts; 2 × diesels; 2 × electric motors
- Speed: 11.26 knots (20.85 km/h; 12.96 mph) (surfaced); 8.7 knots (16.1 km/h; 10.0 mph) (submerged)
- Range: 2,000 nmi (3,700 km; 2,300 mi) at 7.3 knots (13.5 km/h; 8.4 mph) (surfaced); 100 nmi (190 km; 120 mi) at 5 knots (9.3 km/h; 5.8 mph) (submerged)
- Test depth: 40 m (130 ft)
- Complement: 2 officers and 23 crewmen
- Armament: 4 × 450 mm (17.7 in) torpedo tubes (2 × bow, 2 × stern)

Topaze was one of six Émeraude-class submarines built for the French Navy (Marine Nationale) in the first decade of the 20th century.

== Design and description ==
The Émeraude class were built as part of the French Navy's 1903 building program to a Maugas single-hull design. The submarines displaced 395 metric tons (389 long tons) surfaced and 427 metric tons (420 long tons) submerged. They had an overall length of 44.9 meters (147 ft 4 in), a beam of 3.9 meters (12 ft 10 in), and a draft of 3.8 meters (12 ft 6 in). They had an operational diving depth of 40 meters (130 ft). Their crew numbered 2 officers and 23 enlisted men.

For surface running, the boats were powered by two Sautter-Harlé 300-metric-horsepower (296 bhp; 221 kW) diesel engines, each driving one propeller shaft. When submerged each propeller was driven by a 300-metric-horsepower electric motor. They could reach a maximum speed of 11.26 knots (20.85 km/h; 12.96 mph) on the surface and 8.5 knots (15.7 km/h; 9.8 mph) underwater. The Émeraude class had a surface endurance of 2,000 nautical miles (3,700 km; 2,300 mi) at 7.3 knots (13.5 km/h; 8.4 mph) and a submerged endurance of 100 nmi (190 km; 120 mi) at 5 knots (9.3 km/h; 5.8 mph).

The boats were armed with four internal 450-millimeter (17.7 in) torpedo tubes, two in the bow and two in the stern, for which they carried six torpedoes. Topaze and her sister Turquoise were the first French submarines to be equipped with a deck gun when they were fitted with a single 37-millimeter (1.5 in) gun in August 1915.

== Construction and career ==
Topaz was laid down in October 1903 at the Arsenal de Toulon, launched on 2 July 1908 and commissioned on 10 December 1910.

== Bibliography ==
- Couhat, Jean Labayle (1974). French Warships of World War I. London: Ian Allan. ISBN 0-7110-0445-5.
- Gardiner, Robert & Gray, Randal (1985). Conway's All The World's Fighting Ships 1906–1921. London: Conway Maritime Press. ISBN 0-85177-245-5.
- Garier, Gérard (2002). A l'épreuve de la Grande Guerre. L'odyssée technique et humaine du sous-marin en France (in French). Vol. 3–2. Bourg-en-Bresse, France: Marines édition. ISBN 2-909675-81-5.
- Garier, Gérard (1998). Des Émeraude (1905-1906) au Charles Brun (1908–1933). L'odyssée technique et humaine du sous-marin en France (in French). Vol. 2. Bourg-en-Bresse, France: Marines édition. ISBN 2-909675-34-3.
