= HMS Emerald =

Nine ships of the Royal Navy have been named HMS Emerald.

- HMS Emerald (1757) was a 28-gun sixth rate, originally the French Emeraude. She was captured in 1757 by HMS Southampton, and broken up in 1761.
- HMS Emerald (1762) was a 32-gun fifth rate launched in 1762 and broken up in 1793.
- HMS Emerald (1795) was a 36-gun fifth rate launched in 1795 and broken up in 1836.
- HMS Emerald (1820) was a tender purchased in 1820 and broken up in 1847.
- HMS Emerald (1856) was a wood screw frigate launched in 1856 and sold in 1869.
- HMS Emerald (1876) was a screw corvette launched in 1876 and sold in 1906.
- HMS Emerald was an armoured frigate, launched in 1861 as HMS Black Prince, renamed in 1904, and sold in 1923.
- HMS Emerald was a gunboat launched in 1869 as HMS Hawk. She was renamed HMS Amelia in 1888, HMS Colleen in 1905, HMS Colleen Old in 1916, HMS Emerald in 1918 and HMS Cuckoo later in 1918. She was sold in 1922.
- HMS Emerald (D66) was an Emerald-class light cruiser launched in 1920 and broken up in 1948.

A fictional frigate named Emerald is commanded at the Battle of Camperdown by the title character in Lady Caroline Lamb's 1816 novel Glenarvon.

== Battle honours ==
Ships named Emerald have earned the following battle honours: (Note: In the Royal Navy, and other Commonwealth navies that follow the traditions of the RN, battle honours awarded to a ship are inherited by subsequent ships to bear the same name, and are displayed on the ship's honours board.)

- Basque Roads, 1809
- Atlantic, 1939−40
- Normandy, 1944
