= French submarine Saphir (1908) =

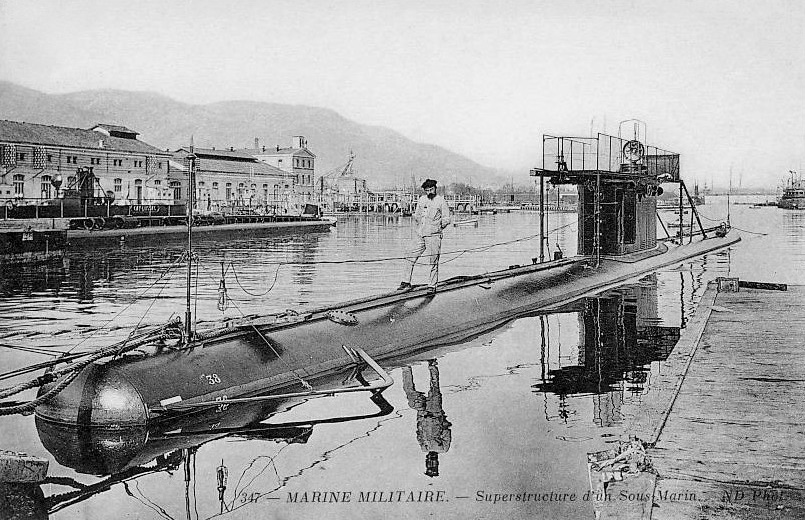
- Saphir in port in Toulon

History

France
- Name: Saphir
- Namesake: Sapphire
- Builder: Arsenal de Toulon
- Laid down: October 1903
- Launched: 6 February 1908
- Completed: 10 December 1910
- Identification: Pennant number: Q44
- Fate: Scuttled 15 January 1915

General characteristics
- Class & type: Émeraude-class submarine
- Displacement: 395 t (389 long tons) (surfaced); 427 t (420 long tons) (submerged)
- Length: 44.9 m (147 ft 4 in) (o/a)
- Beam: 3.9 m (12 ft 10 in)
- Draft: 3.77 m (12 ft 4 in)
- Installed power: 600 PS (440 kW; 590 bhp) (diesel engines); 600 PS (electric motors)
- Propulsion: 2 × shafts; 2 × diesels; 2 × electric motors
- Speed: 11.26 knots (20.85 km/h; 12.96 mph) (surfaced); 8.7 knots (16.1 km/h; 10.0 mph) (submerged)
- Range: 2,000 nmi (3,700 km; 2,300 mi) at 7.3 knots (13.5 km/h; 8.4 mph) (surfaced); 100 nmi (190 km; 120 mi) at 5 knots (9.3 km/h; 5.8 mph) (submerged)
- Test depth: 40 m (130 ft)
- Complement: 2 officers and 23 crewmen
- Armament: 4 × 450 mm (17.7 in) torpedo tubes (2 × bow, 2 × stern)

Saphir was one of six Émeraude-class submarines built for the French Navy (Marine Nationale) in the first decade of the 20th century.

== Design and description ==
The Émeraude class were built as part of the French Navy's 1903 building program to a Maugas single-hull design. The submarines displaced 395 metric tons (389 long tons) surfaced and 427 metric tons (420 long tons) submerged. They had an overall length of 44.9 meters (147 ft 4 in), a beam of 3.9 meters (12 ft 10 in), and a draft of 3.8 meters (12 ft 6 in). They had an operational diving depth of 40 meters (130 ft). Their crew numbered 2 officers and 23 enlisted men.

For surface running, the boats were powered by two Sautter-Harlé 300-metric-horsepower (296 bhp; 221 kW) diesel engines, each driving one propeller shaft. When submerged each propeller was driven by a 300-metric-horsepower electric motor. They could reach a maximum speed of 11.26 knots (20.85 km/h; 12.96 mph) on the surface and 8.5 knots (15.7 km/h; 9.8 mph) underwater. The Émeraude class had a surface endurance of 2,000 nautical miles (3,700 km; 2,300 mi) at 7.3 knots (13.5 km/h; 8.4 mph) and a submerged endurance of 100 nmi (190 km; 120 mi) at 5 knots (9.3 km/h; 5.8 mph).

The boats were armed with four internal 450-millimeter (17.7 in) torpedo tubes, two in the bow and two in the stern, for which they carried six torpedoes.

== Construction and career ==
Saphir was laid down in October 1903 at the Arsenal de Toulon, launched on 6 February 1909 and commissioned on 10 December 1910. Upon her completion, Saphir was assigned to the Mediterranean. In 1913, she joined a squadron based in Bizerte, French Tunisia, to defend the region. In late 1914, she moved to a base at Tenedos so as to be closer to the Dardanelles and to participate in monitoring and blockading of the Turkish Straits.

On 13 December 1914, a British submarine, HMS B11, entered the straits and sank the Ottoman Navy central battery ironclad Messudiyeh. On 15 January 1915, to follow the example of B11 and without prior orders, the commanding officer of Saphir, Lieutenant Henri Fournier, tried to force the entrance of the straits. As Saphir dived under a minefield off Çanakkale, she sprang a leak. The flooding forced Saphir to surface under fire from Ottoman guns, and Fournier gave the order to destroy Saphir′s code documents and scuttle the submarine 1,500 meters (1,640 yards) from the coast. The crew tried to gain ground by swimming. Thirteen of 27 enlisted men and the two officers did not survive the swim to shore, perishing from the cold; the 14 survivors were recovered by two Ottoman Army boats and transferred, after interrogation, to prisons, including the one in Afyonkarahisar. Some soon after were transferred to prisoner-of-war camps in Asia Minor, where they managed to escape.

== Citation ==
A French citation read:

The submarines Saphir and Curie, fallen gloriously in battle, are brought to the agenda of the Naval Army. In his affliction of having seen succumb such valiant servants of the country, the commander-in-chief reminds everyone how proud the army should be to have in its ranks officers and crews capable of heroic actions such as those that were accomplished by these valourous ships whose names will remain in maritime legends. Honour and glory to the officers and crews of the Saphir and Curie, they have truly earned it from the Fatherland.

— Augustin Boué de Lapeyrère, admiral of the French navy

== Bibliography ==
- Couhat, Jean Labayle (1974). French Warships of World War I. London: Ian Allan. ISBN 0-7110-0445-5.
- Gardiner, Robert & Gray, Randal (1985). Conway's All The World's Fighting Ships 1906–1921. London: Conway Maritime Press. ISBN 0-85177-245-5.
- Garier, Gérard (2002). A l'épreuve de la Grande Guerre. L'odyssée technique et humaine du sous-marin en France (in French). Vol. 3–2. Bourg-en-Bresse, France: Marines édition. ISBN 2-909675-81-5.
- Garier, Gérard (1998). Des Émeraude (1905-1906) au Charles Brun (1908–1933). L'odyssée technique et humaine du sous-marin en France (in French). Vol. 2. Bourg-en-Bresse, France: Marines édition. ISBN 2-909675-34-3.
