= Emerald Records (2000s) =

American record label

Emerald Records is also a current record label operated by Cliff Ayers Ostermyer. It is located in Fort Wayne, Indiana, with offices in Nashville, Tennessee.

== See also ==
- List of record labels
- Emerald Records (disambiguation)
