= French submarine Opale =

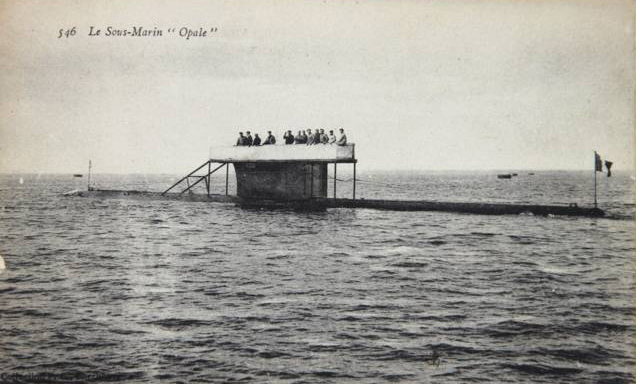
- A French postcard of Opale on the surface

History

France
- Name: Opale
- Namesake: Opal
- Builder: Arsenal de Cherbourg
- Laid down: October 1903
- Launched: 20 November 1906
- Completed: 19 December 1908
- Stricken: 12 November 1919
- Identification: Pennant number: Q42
- Fate: Sold for scrap, 10 May 1921

General characteristics
- Class & type: Émeraude-class submarine
- Displacement: 395 t (389 long tons) (surfaced); 427 t (420 long tons) (submerged)
- Length: 44.9 m (147 ft 4 in) (o/a)
- Beam: 3.9 m (12 ft 10 in)
- Draft: 3.77 m (12 ft 4 in)
- Installed power: 600 PS (440 kW; 590 bhp) (diesel engines); 600 PS (electric motors)
- Propulsion: 2 × shafts; 2 × diesels; 2 × electric motors
- Speed: 11.26 knots (20.85 km/h; 12.96 mph) (surfaced); 8.7 knots (16.1 km/h; 10.0 mph) (submerged)
- Range: 2,000 nmi (3,700 km; 2,300 mi) at 7.3 knots (13.5 km/h; 8.4 mph) (surfaced); 100 nmi (190 km; 120 mi) at 5 knots (9.3 km/h; 5.8 mph) (submerged)
- Test depth: 40 m (130 ft)
- Complement: 2 officers and 23 crewmen
- Armament: 4 × 450 mm (17.7 in) torpedo tubes (2 × bow, 2 × stern)

Opale was one of six Émeraude-class submarines built for the French Navy (Marine Nationale) in the first decade of the 20th century.

== Design and description ==
The Émeraude class were built as part of the French Navy's 1903 building program to a Maugas single-hull design. The submarines displaced 395 metric tons (389 long tons) surfaced and 427 metric tons (420 long tons) submerged. They had an overall length of 44.9 meters (147 ft 4 in), a beam of 3.9 meters (12 ft 10 in), and a draft of 3.8 meters (12 ft 6 in). They had an operational diving depth of 40 meters (130 ft). Their crew numbered 2 officers and 23 enlisted men.

For surface running, the boats were powered by two Sautter-Harlé 300-metric-horsepower (296 bhp; 221 kW) diesel engines, each driving one propeller shaft. When submerged each propeller was driven by a 300-metric-horsepower electric motor. They could reach a maximum speed of 11.26 knots (20.85 km/h; 12.96 mph) on the surface and 8.5 knots (15.7 km/h; 9.8 mph) underwater. The Émeraude class had a surface endurance of 2,000 nautical miles (3,700 km; 2,300 mi) at 7.3 knots (13.5 km/h; 8.4 mph) and a submerged endurance of 100 nmi (190 km; 120 mi) at 5 knots (9.3 km/h; 5.8 mph).

The boats were armed with four internal 450-millimeter (17.7 in) torpedo tubes, two in the bow and two in the stern, for which they carried six torpedoes.

== Construction and career ==
Opale was laid down in October 1903 at the Arsenal de Cherbourg, launched on 27 November 1906 and commissioned on 19 December 1908.

== Bibliography ==
- Couhat, Jean Labayle (1974). French Warships of World War I. London: Ian Allan. ISBN 0-7110-0445-5.
- Gardiner, Robert & Gray, Randal (1985). Conway's All The World's Fighting Ships 1906–1921. London: Conway Maritime Press. ISBN 0-85177-245-5.
- Garier, Gérard (2002). A l'épreuve de la Grande Guerre. L'odyssée technique et humaine du sous-marin en France (in French). Vol. 3–2. Bourg-en-Bresse, France: Marines édition. ISBN 2-909675-81-5.
- Garier, Gérard (1998). Des Émeraude (1905-1906) au Charles Brun (1908–1933). L'odyssée technique et humaine du sous-marin en France (in French). Vol. 2. Bourg-en-Bresse, France: Marines édition. ISBN 2-909675-34-3.
