= Oatfield (confectioner) =

Irish chocolate and confectionery manufacturer

- Type: Confectionery Manufacturer
- Founded: 1927
- Defunct: 2012 (Brand and products still produced by Valeo Confectionery)
- Headquarters: Letterkenny, County Donegal, Ireland
- Area served: Worldwide
- Products: Confectionery
- Number of employees: 95 (peak)
- Parent: Zed Candy Ltd.

Oatfield was a chocolate and confectionery manufacturer located in Letterkenny, County Donegal, Ireland. The company was one of the oldest confectionery manufacturers in Ireland.

== History ==
=== Early years ===
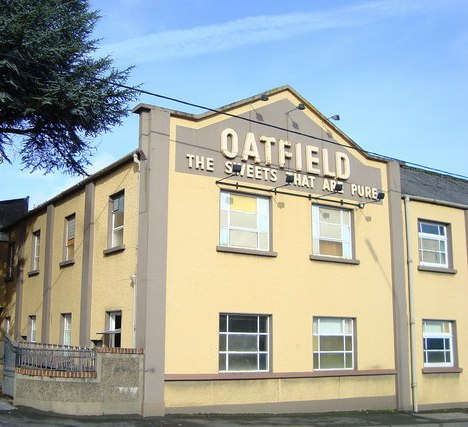
Oatfield premises in Letterkenny

The business began as a wholesale and retail outlet on the Port Road in the town under the name Mayfield Confectionery. The McKinney family began to make their own sweets, and in August 1927, the first sweets were made on an open coke fire in a shed at the back of the shop. The land on which the factory stood was purchased in November 1929, the first sod was cut in February 1930. Six people were employed at the time.

The name was changed to Oatfield soon after establishment as another company in Manchester already traded by this name. The land on which the factory was built was known as Oatfield. The weekly production of confectionery was about 3 tons in the 1930s, and rose to approximately 65 tons a week in the early 2000s.

Sugar was purchased in the 1930s from Tate & Lyle. Glucose came from Manchester. They were delivered by ship and rail via Derry to Letterkenny railway station. Later, glucose was shipped from the Netherlands to the Letterkenny Port. In later years, only Irish sugar and Irish glucose were used. Butter had always been Irish Creamery Butter.

=== Recent years ===
By 1960, Oatfield decided to stop marketing packed sweets made by Cadbury's, Rowntree, Urney's Chocolates, Bassetts Licorice Allsorts, Jacobs Biscuits, William and Wood, Ritchies Mints and Milroy Confectionery and focus entirely on selling Oatfield sweets. This was a major decision and proved a major success for the company. Exporting began in August 1964. The first sweets were 'exported' to Northern Ireland. At the peak of the company's popularity, the sweets were exported worldwide to countries including Malta, United States, Canada, Hong Kong, Australia, Kuwait, Greece and France.

=== Today ===
Donegal Creameries PLC purchased the company in February 1999 for £783,750. In 2007, Zed Candy—an Irish confectionery company famous for its Chewing Gum—bought the brand from Donegal Creameries.

Up until closure, the factory employed approximately 15 people and up to 65 tonnes of sugar and chocolate confectionery were produced each week. The main production lines were Emerald, Toffees, Eclairs, Boiled sweets. The biggest sellers were Emerald, Colleen Assortment and Orange Chocolate.

The factory was closed by the current operators, Zed Candy, on 27 May 2012. Production was soon after moved to the UK. In May 2014 the factory was demolished. Since then, the Oatfield brand and all its products continue to be manufactured by Valeo Foods and are still sold across Ireland.

== Products ==
- Oatfield Emerald
- Oatfield Eskimo Mints
- Oatfield Clove Drops
- Oatfield Eclairs
- Oatfield Glucose Barley
- Oatfield Glucose Fruits
- Oatfield Irish Butter Toffee
- Oatfield Liquorice Toffee
- Oatfield Mint Humbugs
- Oatfield Orange Chocolate
