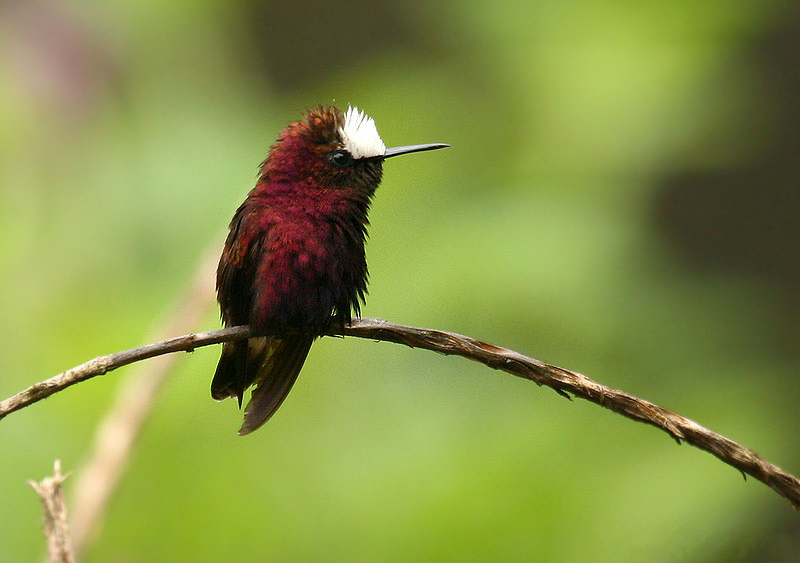
- male
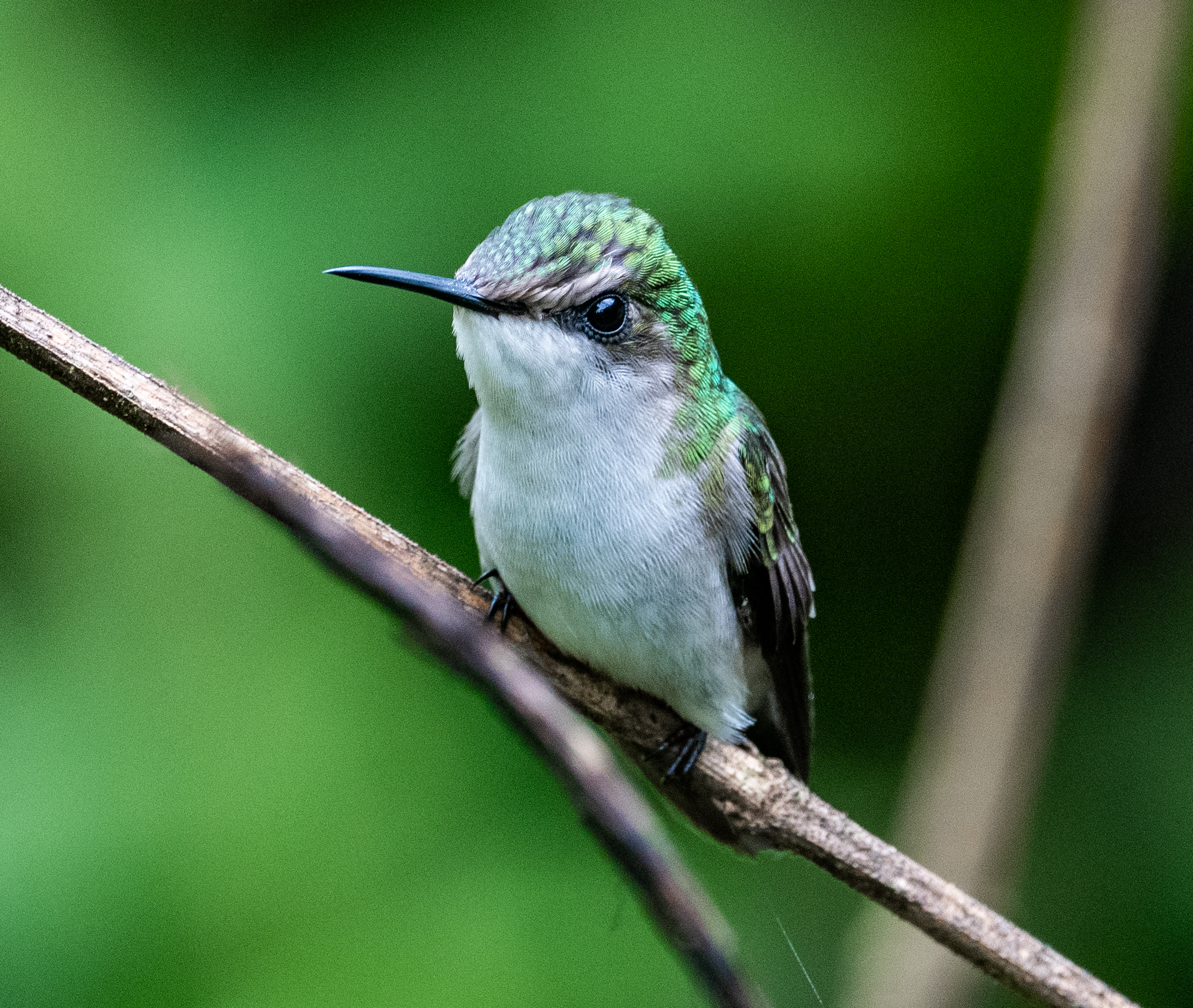
- female

Conservation status
- Least Concern (IUCN 3.1)
- CITES Appendix II (CITES)

Scientific classification
- Kingdom: Animalia
- Phylum: Chordata
- Class: Aves
- Clade: Strisores
- Order: Apodiformes
- Family: Trochilidae
- Genus: Microchera
- Species: M. albocoronata

Binomial name
- Microchera albocoronata (Lawrence, 1855)

Subspecies
- M. a. albocoronata (Lawrence, 1855); M. a. parvirostris (Lawrence, 1865)

= Snowcap =

Species of hummingbird

The snowcap (Microchera albocoronata) is a species of hummingbird in the "emeralds", tribe Trochilini of subfamily Trochilinae. It is found in Costa Rica, Honduras, Nicaragua, and Panama.

== Taxonomy and systematics ==
The snowcap has two subspecies, the nominate M. a. albocoronata and M. a. parvirostris. The nominate was originally described as Mellisuga albo-coronata and the other as Panychlora parvirostris.

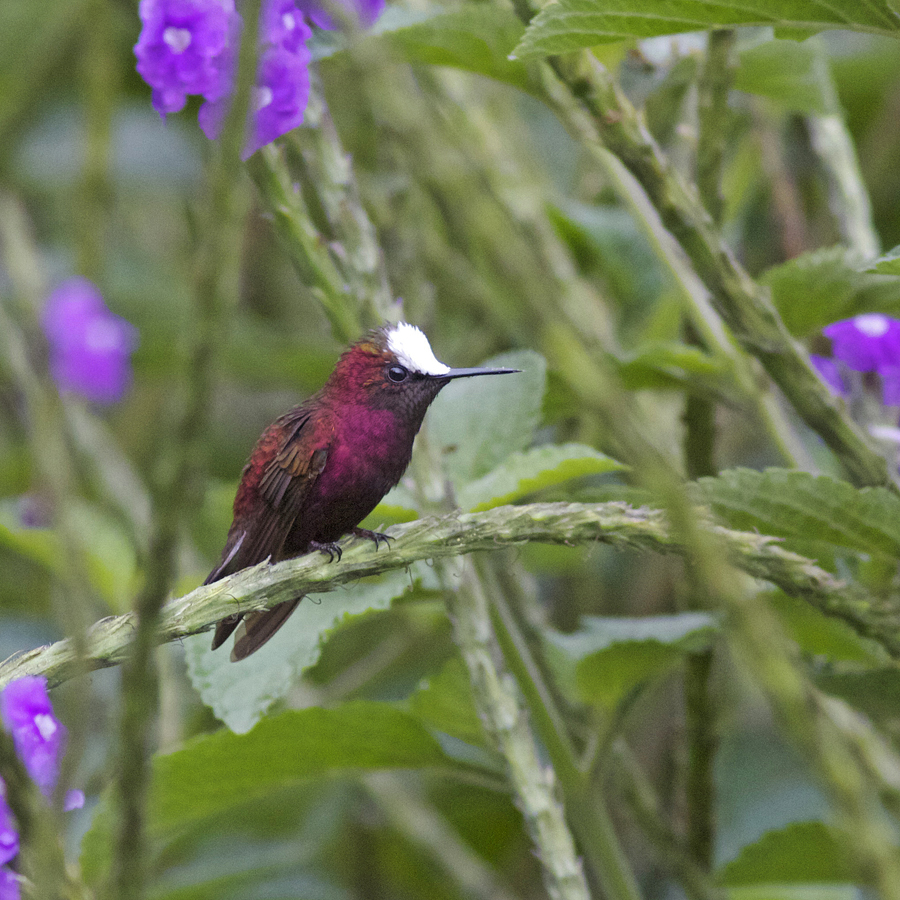
Snowcap (male)

== Description ==
The snowcap is 6.5 to 7 cm (2.6 to 2.8 in) long and weighs about 2.7 g (0.095 oz). Both sexes of both subspecies have a short black bill and black legs. Adult males of both subspecies have the white forehead and crown that give this species its English and scientific names. Males of the nominate subspecies have dark purple upperparts with a purplish black nape and a reddish gloss on the back, rump, and uppertail coverts. Their face and underparts are black with a reddish purple gloss. Their central tail feathers are metallic bronze and the rest have white bases and black ends. Males of M. a. parvirostris differ by having less white on the tail feathers and a brighter coppery purple gloss to their upper- and underparts. Adult females of both subspecies have a metallic green back with bronze uppertail coverts. Their underparts are pale grayish white. Their central tail feathers are bronze and the outer ones mostly black with white at the base and on the tips. Immature males are like the adult female with the addition of a narrow white line above the eye and a gradual change of the whitish underparts to purplish black.

== Distribution and habitat ==
Subspecies M. a. parvirostris is the more northerly and widely distributed of the two. It is found on the Caribbean slope of Central America from southern Honduras through Nicaragua and Costa Rica and possibly into western Panama; it also occurs locally on Costa Rica's Pacific slope. The nominate M. a. albocoronata is found on the Caribbean and Pacific slopes of western Panama. The species inhabits humid lowland and montane forest, semi-open woodlands, and secondary forest. It is more common at openings in the forest and more open landscapes such as plantations than deep in the forest. In Costa Rica it breeds mostly at elevations between 300 and 800 m (980 and 2,600 ft) but locally as high as 1,000 m (3,300 ft). In Panama it is found between 600 and 1,650 m (2,000 and 5,400 ft).

== Behavior ==
=== Movement ===
In Costa Rica, snowcaps mostly descend to lower elevations after breeding but a few individuals wander higher than their breeding zone to about 1,400 m (4,600 ft).

=== Feeding ===
Snowcaps forage for nectar at all heights of their habitat, from the understory to the canopy. Males defend feeding territories from other snowcaps but defer to larger hummingbirds. They typically take nectar from small flowers of epiphytes, shrubs, vines, and trees. In addition to feeding on nectar, snowcaps glean arthropods from foliage, and males take small insects by hawking from a perch.

=== Breeding ===
In Costa Rica snowcaps breed between January and May; their season elsewhere has not been defined. Males court females at leks in loose groups of up to six, singing from a perch and chasing other males. Females build a small cup nest of tree fern scales and plant down bound with spiderweb, with some moss and lichen on the outside. It is typically placed on a twig or dangling vine between 1.7 and 3 m (6 and 10 ft) above the ground. The clutch size is two eggs; the incubation period and time to fledging are not known.

=== Vocalization ===
The male snowcap's song is "a soft, sputtering, warbling melody: tsitsup tsitsup tsitsup tsew ttttt-tsew or tsip-tsee tsippy tsippy tsippy tsip-tick tsew." One call is "a soft, high-pitched, dry tsip", and it makes "buzzy notes and chatters in aggressive interactions".

== Status ==
The IUCN has assessed the snowcap as being of Least Concern, though its population size is not known and is believed to be decreasing. No immediate threats have been identified by the IUCN. In Costa Rica it is locally common, but "severe deforestation threatens many parts of its range".
