= Topaz (disambiguation) =

Topaz is a mineral or gemstone.

Topaz may also refer to:

== Arts ==
=== Fictional characters and places ===
- Topaz (Marvel Comics), a comic book sorceress
- Agent Topaz, a character from the anime Sonic X
- Topaz Trollhopper, a character from the animated series Trollz
- Topaz Mortmain, a character from Dodie Smith's novel I Capture the Castle and its subsequent film adaptation
- Topaz, a character in Steven Universe
- Topaz, a playable character in Honkai: Star Rail

=== Film and television ===
- Topaz (1945 film), an amateur film documenting the World War II Japanese-American internment camp Topaz
- Topaz (1969 film), a film directed by Alfred Hitchcock, based on the novel by Leon Uris
- Topaz (1991 film), a Japanese film
- Topacio, (Spanish for Topaz), a 1984 Venezuelan telenovela

=== Literature ===
- "Sir Thopas", one of The Canterbury Tales
- Topaz (novel), a 1967 novel by Leon Uris

=== Music ===
- Topaz (The Rippingtons album), 1999
- Topaz (Erik Friedlander album), 1999
- Topaz (Israel Nash album), 2021
- Topaz, a band consisting of Billy Cross, Rob Stoner and Jasper Hutchison
- "Topaz", an instrumental song by Journey from their self-titled debut album Journey
- "Topaz", a song by the B-52s from their album Cosmic Thing
- "Topaz", a 2015 single by Jupiter

== Biology ==
- Topaz (apple), a variety of apple
- Topaz (hummingbird), two species of hummingbirds in the genus Topaza
- Ruby topaz (Chrysolampis mosquitus), a species of hummingbird
- Topaz, a protein crystallography-related product of the company Fluidigm

== Organizations ==
- Topaz (bookmaker), in Azerbaijan
- Topaz Energy, a defunct petroleum retail chain in Ireland purchased by Circle K
- TOPAZ (think tank), in the Czech Republic

== Computer related ==
- Topaz, the Ruby (programming language) implementation
- Topaz, the proprietary file format developed for the Amazon Kindle e-reader
- Topaz, the codename for HTC Touch Diamond2, a smartphone by HTC
- Project ToPaZ, an early codename for the GNOME 3 environment

== People ==
- Dudu Topaz (1946–2009), Israeli TV personality and actor
- Topaz, a cryptonym for Rainer Rupp (b. 1945), spy for East Germany who worked at NATO headquarters in Brussels
- Topaz Luk (b. 1992), Israeli government spokesperson
- William Topaz McGonagall (1825-1902), Scottish poet
- Topaz Winters (b. 1999) Pen name of poet Priyanka Aiyer

== Places ==
=== Australia ===
- Topaz, Queensland, a locality in the Tablelands Region, Queensland, Australia

=== United States ===
- Topaz, California
- Topaz, Missouri
- Topaz Hotel, Washington, D.C.
- Topaz War Relocation Center, west of Delta, Utah

== Vehicles ==
- Ekolot KR-030 Topaz, a Polish ultralight aircraft
- Mercury Topaz, a car made by Ford Motor Company from 1984 to 1994
- Topper Topaz, a sailing dinghy which can be rigged with 1, 2 or 3 sails
- The Future Imagery Architecture radar imaging satellites

== Vessels ==
- Topaz (ship), the sailing ship captained by Mayhew Folger that rediscovered Pitcairn Island
- Topaz (yacht), luxury motor yacht constructed by Lürssen in 2012

== Other uses ==
- TOPAZ nuclear reactor, a series of lightweight nuclear reactors flown in space by the Soviet Union and the Russian Federation
- An apprentice in a lascar ship's crew
- Topasses, a group of people of Portuguese descent in East Timor.

== See also ==
- Topaze (disambiguation)
