= Phénix-class submarine =

Cancelled French submarines

Class overview
- Name: Phénix class
- Operators: French Navy
- Planned: 13
- Completed: 0
- Canceled: 13

General characteristics
- Type: Submarine
- Displacement: Surfaced: 1,056 tons; Submerged: 1,252 tons
- Length: 74.90 m (245 ft 9 in)
- Beam: 6.40 m (21 ft 0 in)
- Draft: 3.90 m (12 ft 10 in)
- Installed power: Surfaced: 4,200 bhp (3,100 kW); Submerged: 1,400 shp (1,000 kW)
- Propulsion: Diesel engines; Electric motors; 2 shafts
- Speed: Surfaced: 18 knots (33 km/h; 21 mph); Submerged: 9 knots (17 km/h; 10 mph)
- Capacity: 121 tons fuel oil
- Complement: 45
- Armament: 10 × 550 mm (22 in) torpedo tubes; 1 × 40 mm (1.6 in) anti-aircraft gun; 1 × 20 mm (0.79 in) anti-aircraft gun

The Phénix-class submarine was planned to be a series of 13 submarines for the French Navy. The design was a larger version of the Aurore-class submarine intended for operations in East Asia but was cancelled due to the Fall of France.

== Development and design ==
The Phénix-class design was envisioned to be an enlarged version of the Aurore-class submarine intended for long cruises in East Asia and East Indies. The lengthened hull was used to hold more fuel which extended the design's range, which was planned to also house air conditioning and other equipment for a tropical environment. The lead boat—Phénix—was ordered in 1939 and a further 12 in 1940, which were named Brumaire, Floréal, Frimaire, Fructidor, Germinal, Messidor, Nivôse, Phénix, Pluviôse, Prairial, Thermidor, Vendémiaire, and Ventôse. None were laid down, and were cancelled following the Fall of France.

The design featured a length between perpendiculars of 74.90 metres (245 ft 9 in) with a beam of 6.40 metres (21 ft 0 in) and a draught of 3.90 metres (12 ft 10 in). The boats displaced 1,056 tons surfaced and 1,252 tons submerged, and carried a complement of 45. Propulsion was provided by two shafts driven by diesel engines for surface running and electric motors for submerged operations, producing 4,200 brake horsepower (3,100 kW) surfaced and 1,400 shaft horsepower (1,000 kW) submerged. This machinery enabled a maximum speed of 18 knots (33 km/h; 21 mph) surfaced and 9 knots (17 km/h; 10 mph) submerged. The submarines carried 121 tons of fuel oil. Armament consisted of ten 550-millimetre (22 in) torpedo tubes, one 40 mm (1.6 in) anti-aircraft gun, and one 20 mm (0.79 in) anti-aircraft gun.
