= Émeraude-class submarine (1906) =

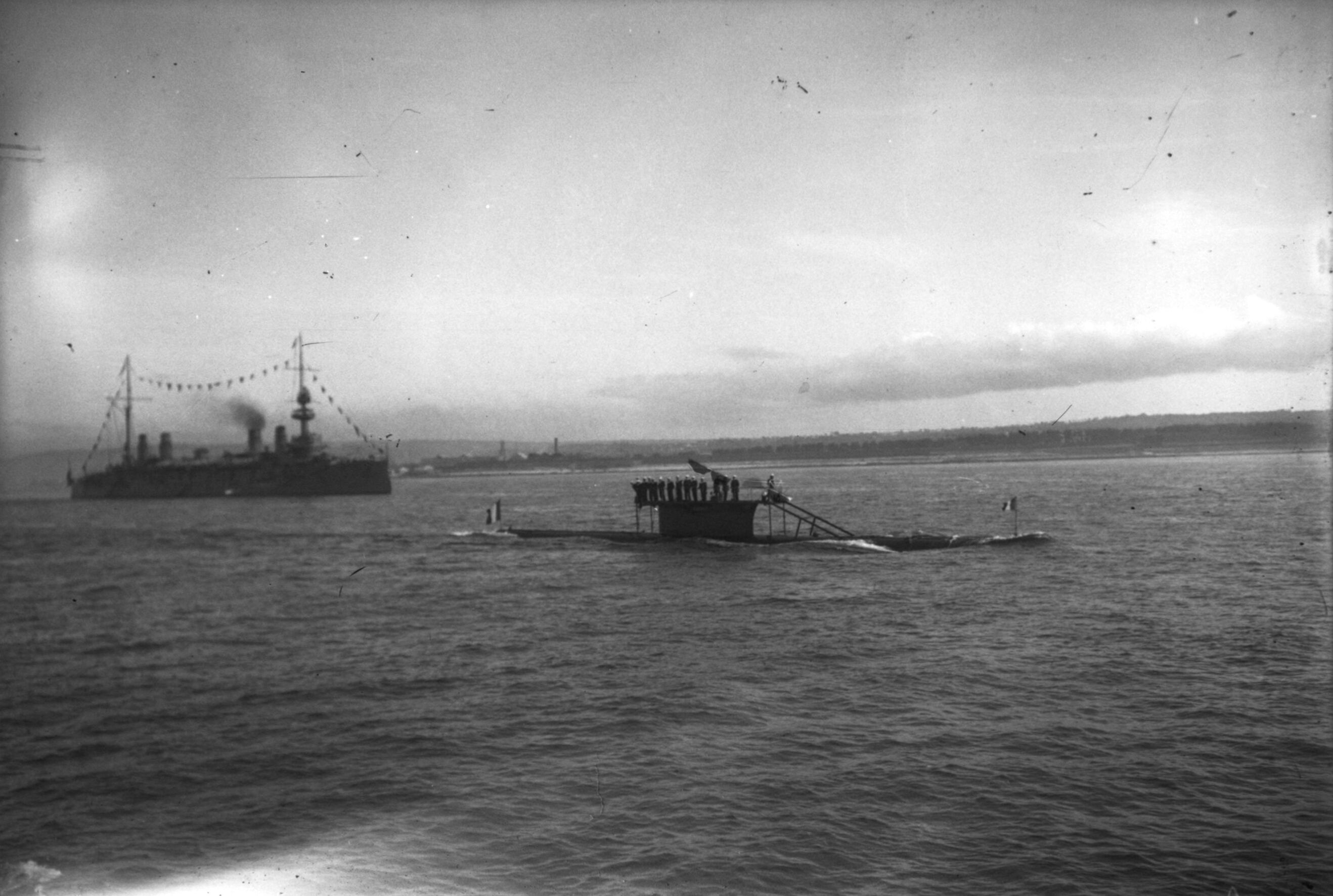
- Émeraude in Cherbourg harbour, 31 July 1909

Class overview
- Name: Émeraude class
- Operators: French Navy
- Preceded by: Oméga
- Succeeded by: Circé class
- Built: 1903–1910
- In commission: 1908–1919
- Completed: 6
- Lost: 1
- Scrapped: 5

General characteristics (as built)
- Type: Submarine
- Displacement: 395 t (389 long tons) (surfaced); 427 t (420 long tons) (submerged)
- Length: 44.9 m (147 ft 4 in) (o/a)
- Beam: 3.9 m (12 ft 10 in)
- Draft: 3.77 m (12 ft 4 in)
- Installed power: 600 PS (440 kW; 590 bhp) (diesel engines); 600 PS (electric motors)
- Propulsion: 2 × shafts; 2 × diesels; 2 × electric motors
- Speed: 11.26 knots (20.85 km/h; 12.96 mph) (surfaced); 8.7 knots (16.1 km/h; 10.0 mph) (submerged)
- Range: 2,000 nmi (3,700 km; 2,300 mi) at 7.3 knots (13.5 km/h; 8.4 mph) (surfaced); 100 nmi (190 km; 120 mi) at 5 knots (9.3 km/h; 5.8 mph) (submerged)
- Test depth: 40 m (130 ft)
- Complement: 2 officers and 23 crewmen
- Armament: 4 × 450 mm (17.7 in) torpedo tubes (2 × bow, 2 × stern)

The Émeraude-class submarines consisted of six submarines built for the French Navy (Marine Nationale) during the first decade of the 20th century. One boat was sunk and another captured during the First World War and the survivors were scrapped after the war.

== Design and description ==
The Émeraude class were built as part of the French Navy's 1903 building program to a Maugas single-hull design. The submarines displaced 395 metric tons (389 long tons) surfaced and 427 metric tons (420 long tons) submerged. They had an overall length of 44.9 meters (147 ft 4 in), a beam of 3.9 meters (12 ft 10 in), and a draft of 3.8 meters (12 ft 6 in). They had an operational diving depth of 40 meters (130 ft). Their crew numbered 2 officers and 23 enlisted men.

For surface running, the boats were powered by two Sautter-Harlé 300-metric-horsepower (296 bhp; 221 kW) diesel engines, each driving one propeller shaft. When submerged each propeller was driven by a 300-metric-horsepower electric motor. They could reach a maximum speed of 11.26 knots (20.85 km/h; 12.96 mph) on the surface and 8.5 knots (15.7 km/h; 9.8 mph) underwater. The Émeraude class had a surface endurance of 2,000 nautical miles (3,700 km; 2,300 mi) at 7.3 knots (13.5 km/h; 8.4 mph) and a submerged endurance of 100 nmi (190 km; 120 mi) at 5 knots (9.3 km/h; 5.8 mph).

The boats were armed with four internal 450-millimeter (17.7 in) torpedo tubes, two in the bow and two in the stern, for which they carried six torpedoes. Topaze and Turquoise were the first French submarines to be equipped with a deck gun when they were fitted with a single 37-millimeter (1.5 in) gun in August 1915.

== Ships ==
Émeraude-class submarines
Name	Builder	Laid down	Launched	Commissioned	Fate
Émeraude	Arsenal de Cherbourg	October 1903	6 August 1906	11 November 1908	Sold for scrap, 27 January 1923
Opale	Arsenal de Cherbourg	October 1903	20 November 1906	19 December 1908	Sold for scrap, 10 May 1921
Rubis	Arsenal de Cherbourg	October 1903	26 June 1907	11 December 1909	Sold for scrap, 10 May 1921
Saphir	Arsenal de Toulon	October 1903	6 February 1908	10 December 1910	Sunk by a naval mine, 15 January 1915
Topaze	Arsenal de Toulon	October 1903	2 July 1908	10 December 1910	Sold for scrap, 10 May 1921
Turquoise	Arsenal de Toulon	October 1903	3 August 1908	10 December 1910	Damaged by Ottoman gunfire and beached on 30 October 1915. Re-floated and repaired by Ottoman forces; renamed Müstecip Onbaşı, but never commissioned. Returned to France and sold for scrap, 14 April 1920

== See also ==
- List of submarines of France

== Bibliography ==
- Couhat, Jean Labayle (1974). French Warships of World War I. London: Ian Allan. ISBN 0-7110-0445-5.
- Gardiner, Robert & Gray, Randal (1985). Conway's All The World's Fighting Ships 1906–1921. London: Conway Maritime Press. ISBN 0-85177-245-5.
- Garier, Gérard (2002). A l'épreuve de la Grande Guerre. L'odyssée technique et humaine du sous-marin en France (in French). Vol. 3–2. Bourg-en-Bresse, France: Marines édition. ISBN 2-909675-81-5.
- Garier, Gérard (1998). Des Émeraude (1905-1906) au Charles Brun (1908–1933). L'odyssée technique et humaine du sous-marin en France (in French). Vol. 2. Bourg-en-Bresse, France: Marines édition. ISBN 2-909675-34-3.
- Roche, Jean-Michel (2005). "Classement par types". Dictionnaire des bâtiments de la flotte de guerre française de Colbert à nos jours 2, 1870 - 2006. Toulon: Roche. ISBN 978-2-9525917-0-6. OCLC 165892922.
