= List of ship launches in 1902 =

The list of ship launches in 1902 includes a chronological list of ships launched in 1902. In cases where no official launching ceremony was held, the date built or completed may be used instead.

| Date | Ship | Class and type | Builder | Location | Country | Notes |
|---|---|---|---|---|---|---|
| 11 January | Koko Head | barquentine | W. A. Boole & Son | Oakland, California | United States | for |
| 24 January | Korrigan | Farfadet-class submarine | Arsenal de Rochefort | Rochefort | France | For French Navy |
| 1 February | Plunger | Plunger-class submarine | Crescent Shipyard | Elizabethport, New Jersey | United States | for |
| 11 February | Noma | Yacht | Burlee Dry Dock Co | Staten Island, New York | United States | for William Bateman Leeds |
| 11 February | Velox | Turbine-powered torpedo-boat destroyer | Hawthorn Leslie and Company | Hebburn | United Kingdom | for Royal Navy |
| 20 February | Kroonland | Ocean liner | William Cramp & Sons | Philadelphia, Pennsylvania | United States | for International Mercantile Marine |
| 22 February | Egyptian Prince | Cargo ship | Blyth Shipbuilding & Dry Docks Co. Ltd | Blyth | United Kingdom | For Prince Line Ltd. |
| 25 February | Strahl | | Wigham Richardson | Newcastle upon Tyne | United Kingdom | for DDG Hansa |
| 8 March | Panama | Passenger ship | Fairfield Shipbuilding and Engineering Company | Govan | United Kingdom | for the Pacific Steam Navigation Company |
| 8 March | Queen | London-class battleship | Devonport Dockyard | Devonport | United Kingdom | for the Royal Navy |
| 22 March | Barry | Bainbridge-class destroyer | Neafie & Levy | Philadelphia, Pennsylvania | United States | for the United States Navy |
| 22 March | Frauenlob | Gazelle-class cruiser | AG Weser | Bremen | Germany | for the Imperial German Navy |
| 22 March | Lancaster | Monmouth-class cruiser | Armstrong Whitworth, | Elswick | United Kingdom | for the Royal Navy |
| 23 March | Adolphe | 4-masted barque | Chantiers de France | Dunkirk | France | for Ant. Dom. Bordes et Fils |
| 25 March | Prince of Wales | London-class battleship | Chatham Dockyard | Chatham | United Kingdom | for the Royal Navy |
| 26 March | Brussels | Passenger ferry | Gourlay Bros | Dundee | United Kingdom | for the Great Eastern Railway |
| 10 April | Corinthic | Passenger ship | Harland & Wolff | Belfast | United Kingdom | For White Star Line. |
| 22 April | Arcona | Gazelle-class cruiser | AG Weser | Bremen | Germany | for the Imperial German Navy |
| 22 April | Aztec | Yacht | Crescent Shipyard | Elizabeth, New Jersey | United States | For: |
| 22 April | Herzogin Cecilie | 4-masted barque | Rickmers Schiffbau AG | Bremerhaven | Germany | for: |
| 23 April | Francesco Ferruccio | Giuseppe Garibaldi-class cruiser | Venice Naval Arsenal | Venice | Italy | for the Regia Marina |
| 24 April | Hopkins | Bainbridge-class destroyer | Harlan and Hollingsworth | Wilmington, Delaware | United States | for the United States Navy |
| April | Arrow | 4-masted barque | A Rodger & Co | Port Glasgow | United Kingdom | for Anglo-American Oil Co Ltd. |
| April | Mount Royal | Sternwheeler | Alexander Watson | Victoria | Canada | for the Hudson's Bay Company |
| April | HMS Kruger | Screw steamer | Votkinsk Machine Building Plant | Votkinsk | Russia | for Caucasus and Mercury |
| 7 May | United Kingdom | Blyth Shipbuilding & Dry Docks Co. Ltd | Blyth | Gamen | Cargo ship | For Rederi A/B Condor. |
| 7 May | Germany | Joh. C. Tecklenborg | Geestemünde | Preußen | Barque | for F. Laeisz |
| 8 May | United Kingdom | John Brown & Company | Clydebank | Duchess of Montrose | Paddle steamer | for the Caledonian Steam Packet Company |
| 9 May | United Kingdom | Vickers Armstrong | Barrow in Furness | Holland 3 | Holland-class submarine | for the Royal Navy |
| 10 May | United States | W. A. Boole & Son | Oakland, California | Makaweli | barquentine | |
| 20 May | Russia | | Mykolaiv | Pamiat Merkuria | Bogatyr-class cruiser | for the Imperial Russian Navy |
| 22 May | United Kingdom | Harland & Wolff | Belfast | Ionic | Passenger ship | For White Star Line. |
| 23 May | United Kingdom | Vickers Armstrong | Barrow in Furness | Holland 4 | Holland-class submarine | for the Royal Navy |
| 10 June | United Kingdom | Holland Torpedo Boat Co | | Holland 5 | Holland-class submarine | for the Royal Navy |
| 14 June | United States | Union Iron Works | San Francisco, California | Paul Jones | Bainbridge-class destroyer | for the United States Navy |
| 18 June | United Kingdom | Devonport Dockyard | Devonport | Encounter | Challenger-class cruiser | for the Royal Navy |
| 21 June | United States | Neafie & Levy | Philadelphia, Pennsylvania | Denver | Denver-class cruiser | for the United States Navy |
| 21 June | United States | William Cramp & Sons | Philadelphia, Pennsylvania | Finland | Ocean liner | for the Red Star Line |
| 21 June | Germany | Blohm + Voss | Hamburg | Friedrich Carl | Prinz Adalbert-class cruiser | for the Imperial German Navy |
| 21 June | United States | Harlan and Hollingsworth | Wilmington, Delaware | Hull | Bainbridge-class destroyer | for the United States Navy |
| 21 June | United States | W. A. Boole & Son | Oakland, California | A. H. Payson | tugboat | |
| 5 July | United Kingdom | Harland & Wolff Ltd | Belfast | Iowa | Passenger ship | |
| 8 July | United Kingdom | Blyth Shipbuilding & Dry Docks Co. Ltd | Blyth | Lusitania | Cargo ship | For J. Hall Jr. & Co. |
| 9 July | United Kingdom | Vickers | Barrow in Furness | A1 | A-class submarine | for the Royal Navy |
| 10 July | United States | Fore River Shipyard | Quincy | Thomas W. Lawson | Schooner | for the Coastwise Transportation Co, Boston |
| 19 July | Russia | Galerniy Island yard | Saint Petersburg | Oryol | Borodino-class battleship | for the Imperial Russian Navy |
| 23 July | Gnôme | Farfadet-class submarine | Arsenal de Rochefort | Rochefort | France | For French Navy |
| 31 July | United States | Union Iron Works | San Francisco, California | Grampus | Plunger-class submarine | sponsored by Mrs. Marley F. Hay |
| 6 August | United Kingdom | Swan, Hunter & Wigham Richardson | Wallsend | Carpathia | Ocean liner | Cunard Line |
| 7 August | Laënnec | Full-rigged ship | Chantiers de Penhoët | Saint-Nazaire | France | for Société Anonyme des Armateurs Nantais |
| 9 August | Germany | Germaniawerft | Kiel | G113 | S90-class torpedo boat | for the Imperial German Navy. |
| 12 August | Germany | AG Vulcan | Stettin | Kaiser Wilhelm II | Ocean liner | for Norddeutscher Lloyd |
| 20 August | United Kingdom | Blyth Shipbuilding & Dry Docks Co. Ltd | Blyth | Yumuri | Cargo ship | For G. de Zaldo. |
| 21 August | United Kingdom | Harland & Wolff | Belfast | Cedric | Ocean liner | for the White Star Line |
| 21 August | Germany | Bremer Vulkan Schiffbau & Machinen Fabrik | Bremen-Vegesack | Prinz Adalbert | Ocean liner | for the Hamburg America Line |
| 4 September | United Kingdom | Fairfield Shipbuilding & Engineering Co Ltd | Govan | Donegal | Monmouth-class cruiser | for the Royal Navy |
| 4 September | United Kingdom | A. & J. Inglis | Glasgow | Bangala | Passenger ship | for the British India Steam Navigation Company |
| 4 September | République | République-class battleship | Arsenal de Brest | Brest | France | for the French Navy |
| 10 September | Germany | Schichau-Werke | Elbing | S115 | S90-class torpedo boat | for the Imperial German Navy. |
| 18 September | Haudaudine | Full-rigged ship | Chantiers de Penhoët | Saint-Nazaire | France | for Société Anonyme des Armateurs Nantais |
| 20 September | United Kingdom | William Beardmore and Company | | Berwick | Monmouth-class cruiser | for the Royal Navy |
| 22 September | Naïade | Naïade-class submarine | Arsenal de Cherbourg | Cherbourg | France | for the French Navy |
| 20 September | United States | Fore River Ship and Engine Company | Quincy, Massachusetts | Des Moines | Denver-class cruiser | for the United States Navy |
| September | Russia | Baltic Works | Saint Petersburg | Knyaz Suvorov | Borodino-class battleship | for the Imperial Russian Navy |
| 2 October | United Kingdom | Allsup & Co. Ltd. | Preston | Scott | Tug | For London and India Docks Company |
| 4 October | Austria-Hungary | Stabilimento Tecnico Triestino | Trieste | Babenberg | Habsburg-class battleship | for the Austro-Hungarian Navy |
| 11 October | United States | Spedden Company | Baltimore, Maryland | Mackinac | Patrol boat | for the United States Revenue Cutter Service |
| 11 October | United States | Spedden Company | Baltimore, Maryland | Winnisimmet | Tugboat | for the United States Revenue Cutter Service |
| 14 October | Germany | Schichau-Werke | Elbing | S116 | S90-class torpedo boat | for the Imperial German Navy. |
| 18 October | United States | W. A. Boole & Son | Oakland, California | Puako | barquentine | |
| 22 October | Italy | Giovanni Ansaldo & Compagnia | | Kasuga | Kasuga-class cruiser | for the Imperial Japanese Navy |
| 29 October | United Kingdom | Pembroke Dockyard, | Pembroke | Cornwall | Monmouth-class cruiser | for the Royal Navy |
| 11 November | United Kingdom | Allsup & Co. Ltd. | Preston | Holland | Tug | For London & India Docks Co. |
| 15 November | Japan | Yokosuka Naval Arsenal | | Niitaka | Niitaka-class cruiser | for the Imperial Japanese Navy |
| 15 November | United Kingdom | Harland & Wolff | Belfast | Orita | Passenger ship | For Pacific Steam Navigation Company. |
| 15 November | United Kingdom | Sir J. Laing & Sons Ltd | Sunderland, County Durham | Yamuna | Passenger ship | for the British India Steam Navigation Company |
| 28 November | United Kingdom | Gourlay Bros | Dundee | Batavier V | Passenger ship | for the Batavier Line, Rotterdam |
| 11 December | Germany | Howaldtswerke-Deutsche Werft | Kiel | Undine | Gazelle-class cruiser | for the Imperial German Navy |
| 16 December | United Kingdom | London & Glasgow Co Ltd | Govan | Cumberland | Monmouth-class cruiser | for the Royal Navy |
| 15 December | Japan | Kure Naval Arsenal | | Tsushima | Niitaka-class cruiser | for the Imperial Japanese Navy |
| 18 December | United Kingdom | Harland and Wolff | Belfast | Arabic | Ocean liner | for White Star Line |
| 20 December | Germany | Germaniawerft | Kiel | Braunschweig | Braunschweig-class battleship | for the Imperial German Navy |
| Unknown date | United States | Union Iron Works | San Francisco, California | Alaskan | Cargo ship | For American-Hawaiian Steamship Company. |
| Unknown date | Germany | Rickmers AG | | Andree Rickmers | Cargo ship | For Norddeutscher Lloyd. |
| Unknown date | United States | Union Iron Works | San Francisco, California | Arizonan | Cargo ship | For American-Hawaiian Steamship Company. |
| Unknown date | United Kingdom | Goole Shipbuilding & Repairing Co. Ltd. | Goole | Bia | Steamship | For Swedish owners. |
| Unknown date | United Kingdom | Beeching Brothers Ltd. | Great Yarmouth | Boy Ernest | Steam drifter | For Henry Eastick. |
| Unknown date | United Kingdom | J. Blumer & Co. | Sunderland | Burbo Bank | Cargo ship | For Fenwick Shipping Co Ltd. |
| Unknown date | United Kingdom | Beeching Brothers Ltd. | Great Yarmouth | Bure | Steam drifter | For Great Yarmouth Steam Drifters Ltd. |
| Unknown date | United States | | Wyandotte, Michigan | Columbia | Passenger ship | For private owner. |
| Unknown date | United Kingdom | Allsup & Co. Ltd. | Preston | Conservator | Tug | For King's Lynn Conservancy Board. |
| Unknown date | United Kingdom | Beeching Brothers Ltd. | Great Yarmouth | Coronation | Steam drifter | For Robert T. Moore. |
| Unknown date | Russia | Baltic Plant | Saint Petersburg | Delfin | Submarine | For Imperial Russian Navy. |
| Unknown date | United States | Burlee Dry Dock Company | Staten Island, New York | Druid | Steam yacht | For W. W. Dwyer.. |
| Unknown date | United States | Gas Engine and Power Company and Charles L. Seabury and Sons Company | Morris Heights, New York | Fantana | Motorboat | For . |
| Unknown date | United States | Pusey & Jones | Wilmington, Delaware | General Putnam | Ferry | For John E Moore & Co. |
| Unknown date | United Kingdom | Beeching Brothers Ltd. | Great Yarmouth | Girl Kathleen | Steam drifter | For Frederick Salmon. |
| Unknown date | United States | Greenport Yacht & Basin Company | Long Island, New York | Heather | Yacht | For private owner. |
| Unknown date | United States | New York Shipbuilding Company | Camden, New Jersey | J. M. Guffey | Tanker | For Gulf Refining Company. |
| Unknown date | United States | Jenks Shipbuilding Co. | | John B. Cowle | Bulk freighter | For Cowle Transportation Co. |
| Unknown date | United Kingdom | Thames Iron Works | Leamouth | Louisa Heartwell | Lifeboat | For Royal National Lifeboat Institution. |
| Unknown date | United States | | New Orleans, Louisiana | Nahma | Motor boat | For private owner. |
| Unknown date | United States | George L Welt | Waldoboro, Maine | Paul Palmer | Schooner | For William H Palmer. |
| Unknown date | United States | Menhaden Products Company | Newport, Rhode Island | Pocomoke | Tug | For Menhaden Products Company. |
| Unknown date | Germany | Neptun Werft | Rostock | Prinz Sigismund | Cargo liner | For Hamburg-Amerika Line. |
| Unknown date | United Kingdom | Furness Withy | West Hartlepool | Rapallo | Cargo ship | For Holland-Amerika Line. |
| Unknown date | United Kingdom | Brown & Clapson | Barton-upon-Humber | Swift | Humber Keel | For Henry Oldridge. |
| Unknown date | United Kingdom | Wigham Richardson & Co Ltd. | Newcastle upon Tyne | Szell Kalman | Cargo ship | For Royal Hungarian Sea Navigation Company. |
| Unknown date | United States | New York Shipbuilding Corporation | Camden, New Jersey | Texan | Passenger ship | For American-Hawaiian Steamship Company. |
| Unknown date | United Kingdom | Brown & Clapson | Barton-upon-Humber | Venus | Humber Keel | For George Hill. |
| Unknown date | United States | F. W. McCullough | Norfolk, Virginia | Virginia | Schooner | For W. M. Holland. |
| Unknown date | United Kingdom | Beeching Brothers Ltd. | Great Yarmouth | Waveney | Steam drifter | For Great Yarmouth Steam Drifters Ltd. |
| Unknown date | United Kingdom | Beeching Brothers Ltd. | Great Yarmouth | Wensum | Steam drifter | For Great Yarmouth Steam Drifters Ltd. |
| Unknown date | United Kingdom | Beeching Brothers Ltd. | Great Yarmouth | Yare | Steam drifter | For Great Yarmouth Steam Drifters Ltd. |
