= French submarine Y =

Experimental vessel launched in 1905

Y
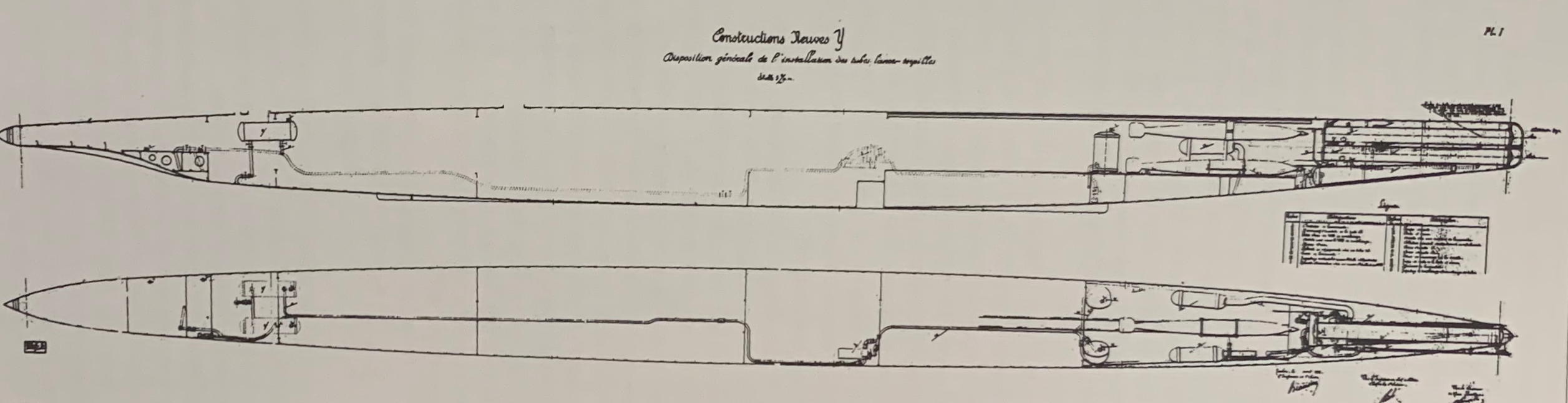
- Profile and plan views of Y's hull, detailing the torpedo system

Class overview
- Name: Y
- Operators: French Navy
- Preceded by: Z
- Succeeded by: Aigrette class
- Built: 1902–1905
- In service: 1905–1909
- Completed: 1

History
- Ordered: 12 August 1901
- Builder: Arsenal de Toulon
- Laid down: 22 May 1902
- Launched: 24 July 1905
- Commissioned: 25 July 1905 (for trials)
- Decommissioned: 1 March 1909
- Stricken: 22 April 1909
- Fate: Sold for scrap, 2 August 1911

General characteristics
- Type: Experimental submarine
- Displacement: 213 long tons (216 t) (surfaced); 226 long tons (230 t) (submerged)
- Length: 44.9 m (147 ft 4 in)
- Beam: 3 m (9 ft 10 in)
- Draught: 2.75 m (9 ft)
- Installed power: 1 × diesel engine (250 hp (186 kW))
- Propulsion: 1 × variable-pitch propeller
- Speed: 10 knots (19 km/h; 12 mph) (surfaced); 6 knots (11 km/h; 6.9 mph) (submerged)
- Complement: 15 men
- Armament: 2 × 450 mm (17.7 in) bow torpedo tubes; 2 × 450 mm (17.7 in) Drzewiecki drop collar torpedo launchers; 1 × 450 mm (17.7 in) external torpedo cradle

The French submarine Y was an experimental submarine built for the French Navy (Marine nationale) in the first decade of the 20th century. She was launched in 1905, but was only commissioned for her sea trials and remained in experimental status because her diesel engine could not be used underwater. A planned refit, which included adding an electric motor and batteries for underwater use in 1907 was cancelled as too expensive. Y was stricken from the navy list in 1909, but was retained for experimental purposes until 1911 when she was sold for scrap.

== Background and description ==
Louis-Émile Bertin, the Director of Naval Construction (Directeur des Constructions Navales), proposed in 1900 to adapt the design of the Gustave Zédé to accept an experimental closed-cycle diesel engine that could propel the boat both underwater and on the surface. The four-cylinder engine was designed to use one of two methods underwater: it could use either two or four cylinders using compressed air and exhausting its combustion gases underwater, or it could use a single cylinder with the exhaust gases being stored under pressure and intermittently released. His proposal was accepted by the Board of Construction (Conseil des travaux) and approved by Navy Minister Jean Marie Antoine de Lanessan.

The single-hulled submarine Y had an overall length of 44.9 m (147 ft 4 in), a beam of 3 metres (9 ft 10 in) and a draught of 2.75 metres (9 ft 0 in). The boat had a surfaced displacement of 213 long tons (216 t) and a submerged displacement of 226 long tons (230 t). She had a complement of 15 men. Her armament comprised two superimposed 450-millimetre (17.7 in) torpedo tubes in the bow, two external 450 mm Drzewiecki drop collar torpedo launchers and one external 450 mm cradle aft.

The submarine was powered by a 250-horsepower (186 kW) diesel engine that drove a single propeller shaft. It was intended to give Y a maximum speed of 10 knots (19 km/h; 12 mph) on the surface and 6 knots (11 km/h; 6.9 mph) while submerged. Tests conducted by the builder, Compagnie française des moteurs à gaz et des constructions mécaniques, between 18 July 1904 and 13 February 1905 revealed that the engine could not use compressed air while submerged. Further testing in March 1907 aboard the submarine showed that the engine's exhaust could not be discharged underwater, limiting the submarine to traveling on the surface.

== Construction and career ==
Y was ordered with the budget number Q37 from the Arsenal de Toulon on 12 August 1901 and was laid down on 22 May 1902. The boat was authorized to be commissioned for her trials on 23 July 1905, the day before she was launched. Y cost F924,300.

Gaston Thomson, the Navy Minister, ordered the shipyard to study reconstructing Y with an electric motor and batteries for submerged running on 31 October 1906 and approved the resulting design on 12 December 1907. Repeated mechanical failures of the diesel engine during the boat's trials caused Thomson to suspend the refit on 24 April 1908 and cancelled it entirely on 16 May. He authorized the shipyard to initiate proceedings to condemn the submarine as she would not be worth the high cost of the reconstruction. Y was decommissioned on 1 March 1909 and stricken from the navy list on 22 April, although she was retained by the shipyard for crush testing. The submarine was stripped of some parts, included her Drzewiecki launchers and periscope, that were incorporated into the submarine Argonaute then building. She was offered for sale on 1 August 1911 and was sold the following day for scrap.

== See also ==
- List of submarines of France
