= French ship Aigrette =

French ship Aigrette includes the following ships named for aigrette, French for egret:

- French frigate Aigrette, a 30-gun frigate launched in 1756
- French submarine Aigrette, lead boat of the Aigrette-class submarine, launched in 1904
