= La Boissière-en-Gâtine =

- Commune
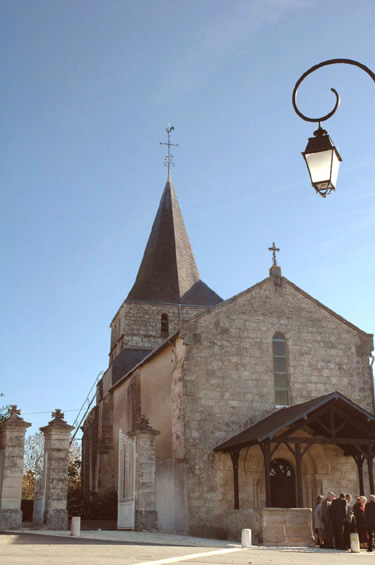
- Saint-Martin church in La Boissière-en-Gâtine
- Location of La Boissière-en-Gâtine
- Location within France Location within Nouvelle-Aquitaine
- Coordinates: 46°33′25″N 0°22′06″W
- Country: France
- Region: Nouvelle-Aquitaine
- Department: Deux-Sèvres
- Arrondissement: Parthenay
- Canton: La Gâtine

Government
  - Mayor (2020–2026): Thierry Deligné
- Area^{1}: 10.98 km^{2} (4.24 sq mi)
- Elevation: 180 m (590 ft)
- Highest elevation: 218 m (715 ft)
- Lowest elevation: 118 m (387 ft)
- Population (2023): 223
  - Density: 20.3/km^{2} (52.6/sq mi)
- Time zone: UTC+01:00 (CET)
  - Summer (DST): UTC+02:00 (CEST)
- INSEE/Postal code: 79040 /79310
- ^{1} French Land Register data, which excludes lakes, ponds, glaciers > 1 km^{2} (0.386 sq mi or 247 acres) and river estuaries.

La Boissière-en-Gâtine is a commune in the Deux-Sèvres department in the Nouvelle-Aquitaine region in western France.

== History ==
There used to be a commandery of the Knights Templar, which later passed to the Hospitallers, hence the name L'Hôpiteau de la Boissière-en-Gâtine. Maison du Temple de La Boissière-en-Gâtine

La Boissiére-en-Gatine is in the canton of Maziéres en Gatine but in fact geographically speaking it is nearer to Allonne.

St Martin's church, which was restored in the 18th century, is a Romanesque building. The door dates from the 11th century. The bell tower was built in the 17th century. The church has been on the list of historical monuments since 1929.

During the revolution, Louis-Hercule Terrasson, the local priest, swore allegiance to the Constitution. He was attacked by the Vendéens who did not accept his republican opinions. He defended himself and managed to fight them off. Later he abandoned his parish and fled to Champdeniers. However, he regretted having resigned and took up his functions again. He was still priest in La Boissiére in 1798.

La Boissiére is the home of the Maison Noble (mansion house) of Puy Robin and there was, at one time, a commandery which later belonged to the charitable order of Jerusalem.

Situated between Puymonnier and la Roche-Marot this place was, according to local legends, the meeting place for little elves called “Farfadet” During an evening party a shepherdess crushed the Farfadet's big toe with her spindle because he was getting on her nerves. The Fadets are wild and very hairy. They like rocky places where they live in community. Apart from their hairiness, you can recognize the Fadets by their thick unbleached woolen panties. There are Madames Fadets, the Fadettes, they are just as grumpy as their gruff husbands but still prettier. Their number has steadily decreased over the centuries. Nowadays, they are few and very difficult to observe.

== Administration ==
List of mayors
Term		Name
2001	2008	Gérard Boutin
2008	2018 (stepped down)	Yannick Pacreau
2018	incumbent	Thierry Deligné

Maire de La Boissière-en-Gâtine (79)

== Population ==
Historical population
Year	Pop.	±% p.a.
1968	346	—
1975	301	−1.97%
1982	302	+0.05%
1990	277	−1.07%
1999	251	−1.09%
2007	243	−0.40%
2012	231	−1.01%
2017	246	+1.27%
2023	223	−1.62%
Source: INSEE

== Economy ==
The village has an economic activity based on agriculture, especially livestock. The main employer in the commune is the company Boye Accouvage, which employs about a hundred people.

== Places and monuments ==
The Church of Saint-Martin is classified as an historical monument from the 12th century.

== See also ==
- Communes of the Deux-Sèvres department

La Boissière-en-Gâtine is a rural commune in Deux-Sèvres, Nouvelle-Aquitaine. The commune includes several small hamlets, including Puy Robin.
