= Q36 =

Q36 may refer to:

- Q36 (album), by The Rentals
- Q36 (New York City bus)
- French submarine Z (Q36)
- Ya-Sin, the 36th surah of the Quran
