= Q38 =

Q38 may refer to:

- Q38 (New York City bus)
- French submarine Aigrette (Q38)
- London Underground Q38 Stock
- Ṣād (surah), of the Quran
