= French submarine Farfadet =

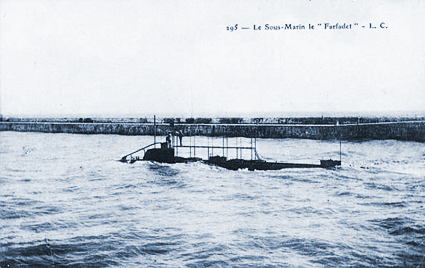
- Farfadet, c. 1905

History

France
- Name: Farfadet
- Ordered: 27 September 1899
- Launched: 17 May 1901
- Renamed: Follet, 17 December 1908
- Stricken: 22 November 1913
- Fate: Sunk, 5 July 1905 and refloated; Scrapped after 1924

General characteristics
- Class & type: Farfadet-class submarine
- Displacement: 185 t (182 long tons) (surfaced); 202 t (199 long tons) (submerged)
- Length: 41.3 m (135 ft 6 in)
- Beam: 2.9 m (9 ft 6 in)
- Draught: 2.7 m (8 ft 10 in)
- Installed power: 300 PS (300 bhp; 220 kW)
- Propulsion: 1 shaft, 2 electric motors
- Speed: 8 knots (15 km/h; 9.2 mph) (surfaced); 4.3 knots (8.0 km/h; 4.9 mph) (submerged)
- Range: 75 nmi (139 km; 86 mi) at 5 knots (9.3 km/h; 5.8 mph) (surfaced); 28 nmi (52 km; 32 mi) at 4.3 knots (8.0 km/h; 4.9 mph) (submerged)
- Complement: 14
- Armament: 4 × external 450 mm (17.7 in) torpedo launchers

Farfadet (Q7) was the lead ship of her class of four single-hulled submarines built for the French Navy at the beginning of the 20th century. Farfadet accidentally sank in July 1905 at Bizerte with the loss of 14 men of her crew; two men survived. She was later refloated and recommissioned as the Follet. She was stricken in November 1913.

== Design and description ==
Farfadet was ordered by the French Navy under its 1899 building programme. She was designed by Gabriel Maugas, an early French submarine engineer, as an all-electric, single-hulled submarine. The boat displaced 185 metric tons (182 long tons) surfaced and 202 metric tons (199 long tons) submerged. She had an overall length of 41.35 meters (135 ft 8 in), a beam of 2.9 meters (9 ft 6 in), and a draft of 2.7 meters (8 ft 10 in). The crew of the Farfardets numbered 2 officers and 12 enlisted men.

The boats were powered by a pair of Sautter-Harlé electric motors providing a total of 300 metric horsepower (296 bhp; 221 kW), both driving the single propeller shaft equipped with a variable-pitch propeller. Farfardet was fitted with side-thrusting propellers (French: évoleurs) at the stern to assist in steering. They could reach a maximum speed of 8 knots (15 km/h; 9.2 mph) on the surface and 4.3 knots (8.0 km/h; 4.9 mph) underwater. The Farfadet class had a surface endurance of 75 nautical miles (139 km; 86 mi) at 5 knots (9.3 km/h; 5.8 mph) and a submerged endurance of 28 nmi (52 km; 32 mi) at 4.3 knots (8.0 km/h; 4.9 mph).

The submarines were armed with four fixed external 450-millimeter (17.7 in) Tissier torpedo launchers. Two were aimed forward and the others were aimed to the rear, all of which were angled 10.3 degrees off the centerline.

== Construction and career ==
Ordered in January 1900, Farfadet was laid down at the Arsenal de Rochefort on 2 April 1900, launched on 17 May 1901, and commissioned on 29 August 1902.The submarine is remembered chiefly for the accident of 6 July 1905, off the coast of Tunisia, which killed 14 of its crew. The details of the catastrophe, once released by the press, horrified France and drew national attention to the dangers of submarines, which the French Ministry of Marine was at that time investing a great deal of money in. After the Farfadet accident and the recent British HMS A8 submarine disaster (June 1905), sailors began to refer to submarines as "iron tombs".

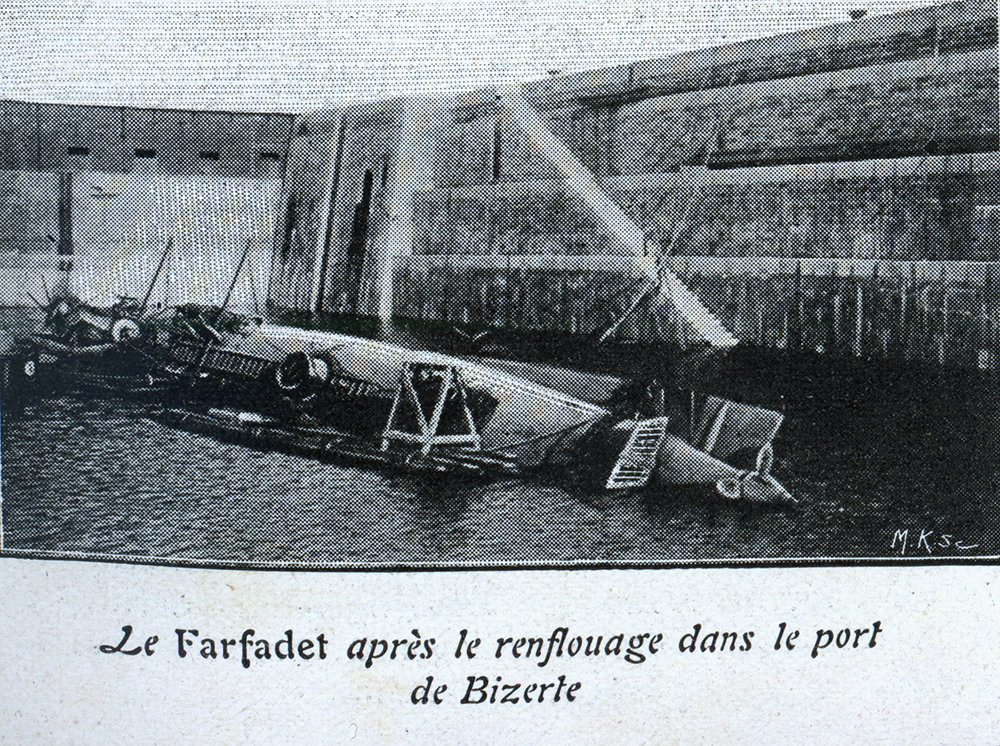
Faradet raised 1905

On 6 July 1905, during a routine patrol en route from Sidi Abdallah to Bizerte, in Tunisia, Farfadet sank suddenly, taking 14 of her crew with her. Only two escaped, being on deck when the incident occurred. A rescue attempt failed and the crew were lost. Farfadet was raised a week later, restored and recommissioned on 17 December 1908 under the name Follet ("Will-o-the-wisp"). She remained in service for five years before being stricken in November 1913.

== Name ==
Farfadet means "merry spirit" and is a type of sprite or goblin in French folktale. The goblin is present in the folklore of the south of France, the Vendée and Poitou.

== Accident ==
=== As reported in The Times ===
The Times of 7 July 1905 reports that, on a routine cruise after leaving the port of Sidi Abdullah in French Tunisia, Farfadet, heading for its home port of Bizerte in Tunisia, attempted to dive with a "skylight" (hatch) improperly shut. The guard officer tried to force it closed and then, mistakenly, tried to open it and slam it shut again. The submarine had by this point submerged; the force of the water forced the hatch down in a skewed position from which it would not move. As the submarine dived the hatch was forced from its place entirely and the guard captain blown from his position by the force of the water. Four sailors in the bow were drowned, and the weight of water in the flooded forward section caused Farfadet to dip and dive straight down, where it became embedded in the mud at the bottom of the harbour.

=== Alternative version ===
Submarine pioneer John P. Holland wrote in How To Fly Like a Bird (1906) that Farfadet had moved in such a way as to upset her ballast tank, which in turn submerged an open hatch. A similar fate was suffered by the British A8, which had spun onto its side while trying to avoid a trawler, dipping its conning tower underwater and so flooding itself, "excepting that in [Farfadet's] case there occurred a change of speed or inclination that caused the water in her partially filled tank to move to her forward end, thus causing the common centre of gravity of the boat, and the water in its tanks, to move far enough forward to force the forward part of the boat under water. This unexpected manoeuvre, combined with her speed, forced the top of her turret under and she took enough water on board to send her to the bottom."

=== Attempted rescue and salvage ===
The Times of 7 July 1905 records that at 9am on 7 July, divers reached Farfadet and found that the crew were responding to knocks. Four hawser (steel) cables were wrapped around the submarine in preparation for the arrival of a 20-ton pontoon and crane, belonging to the Hersen Company. At 3.20pm the vessel was raised, its aft portion breaking the water so that airlocks could be opened and the air inside renewed for the surviving crew. Attempts were then made to ground the submarine in shallow water, but at 12.45 the next morning the crane broke, sending the submarine back to the bottom of the harbour. Further efforts to recover it, involving the French steamer Audax, were in vain.

On 15 July 1905, Farfadet was raised using a floating dock and towed to the harbour of Sidi Abdallah. That night work began on removing the bodies. The four in the forward compartment had died instantly, the eight aft when the crane had broken. It was found that the sailors had attempted to plug the airholes with their tunics. Two more bodies were found amidships.

It was found that the sulfuric acid of the engine's accumulators (batteries) had combined with the seawater to create hydrochloric acid, which had eaten away the instruments and bodies and made work on retrieval impossible until ventilators had been fitted to the aft of the vessel. The last of the crew had died after being trapped for 32 hours. Eight of the 14 crew were from Brittany.

== Bibliography ==
- Garier, Gérard (1995). Du Plongeur (1863) aux Guêpe (1904) [From Plongeur (1863) to Guêpe (1904)]. L'odyssée technique et humaine du sous-marin en France (in French). Vol. 1. Bourg-en-Bresse, France: Marines édition. ISBN 2-909675-19-X.
- Roberts, Stephen S. (2021). French Warships in the Age of Steam 1859–1914: Design, Construction, Careers and Fates. Barnsley, UK: Seaforth Publishing. ISBN 978-1-5267-4533-0.
