= French submarine Gnôme =

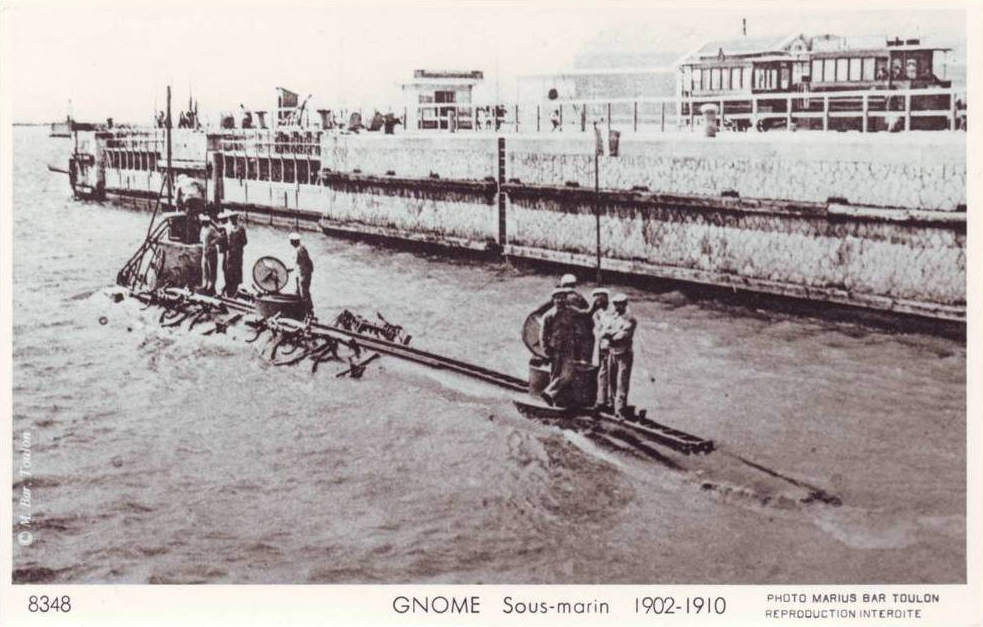
- Gnome in Toulon harbor about 1906

History

France
- Name: Gnome
- Ordered: 27 September 1899
- Laid down: about 1901
- Launched: 23 July 1901
- Commissioned: 2 June 1905
- Decommissioned: 1906
- Stricken: 3 August 1910
- Fate: Sold for scrap, 24 March 1912

General characteristics
- Class & type: Farfadet-class submarine
- Displacement: 185 t (182 long tons) (surfaced); 202 t (199 long tons) (submerged)
- Length: 41.35 m (135 ft 8 in) (o/a)
- Beam: 2.9 m (9 ft 6 in)
- Draught: 2.7 m (8 ft 10 in)
- Installed power: 183 bhp (136 kW)
- Propulsion: 1 shaft; 2 electric motors
- Speed: 6.1 knots (11.3 km/h; 7.0 mph) (surfaced); 4.3 knots (8.0 km/h; 4.9 mph) (submerged)
- Range: 430 nmi (800 km; 490 mi) at 5 knots (9.3 km/h; 5.8 mph) (surfaced); 28 nmi (52 km; 32 mi) at 4.32 knots (8.00 km/h; 4.97 mph) (submerged)
- Complement: 14
- Armament: 4 × exterior 450 mm (17.7 in) torpedo launchers

Gnôme was one of four Farfadet-class submarines built for the French Navy at the beginning of the 20th century.

== Design and description ==
Derived from the Morse by Gabriel Maugas, the Farfadets were single-hulled, and powered by electric motors only, limiting their range and surface performance compared to the contemporary Sirène class. However they had variable-pitch propellers, developed by Maugas, obviating the need for a reversing engine.

The boats displaced 185 metric tons (182 long tons) on the surface and 202 metric tons (199 long tons) submerged. They had an overall length of 41.35 meters (135 ft 8 in), a beam of 2.9 meters (9 ft 6 in), and a draft of 2.7 meters (8 ft 10 in). The crew of all of the submarines numbered 2 officers and 12 enlisted men. The boats were powered by a pair of Sautter-Harlé electric motors providing a total of 300 metric horsepower (296 bhp; 221 kW), both driving the single propeller shaft. The boats were fitted with side-thrusting propellers (French: évoleurs) at the stern to assist in steering. They could reach a maximum speed of 6.1 knots (11.3 km/h; 7.0 mph) on the surface and 4.3 knots (8.0 km/h; 4.9 mph) underwater. The Farfadet class had a surface endurance of 430 nautical miles (800 km; 490 mi) at 5 knots (9.3 km/h; 5.8 mph) and a submerged endurance of 28 nmi (52 km; 32 mi) at 4.3 knots (8.0 km/h; 4.9 mph).

The boats were armed with four external 450-millimeter (17.7 in) Tissier torpedo launchers, two aimed forward and two aimed to the rear.

== Construction and career ==
Gnôme was ordered on 27 September 1899 and was laid down in 1901 at Arsenal de Rochefort. She was launched on 23 July 1902 and was commissioned on 2 June 1905.

== Bibliography ==
- Garier, Gérard (1995). L'odyssée technique et humaine du sous-marin en France [The Technical and Human Odyssey of the Submarine in France: From Plongeur (1863) to Guêpe (1904)] (in French). Vol. 1: Du Plongeur (1863) aux Guêpe (1904). Marines édition. ISBN 2-909675-19-X.
- Roberts, Stephen S. (2021). French Warships in the Age of Steam 1859–1914: Design, Construction, Careers and Fates. Seaforth Publishing. ISBN 978-1-5267-4533-0.
- Stanglini, Ruggero & Cosentino, Michelle (2022). The French Fleet: Ships, Strategy and Operations, 1870-1918. Seaforth Publishing. ISBN 978-1-5267-0131-2.
