= French submarine Lutin =

Farfadet-class submarine

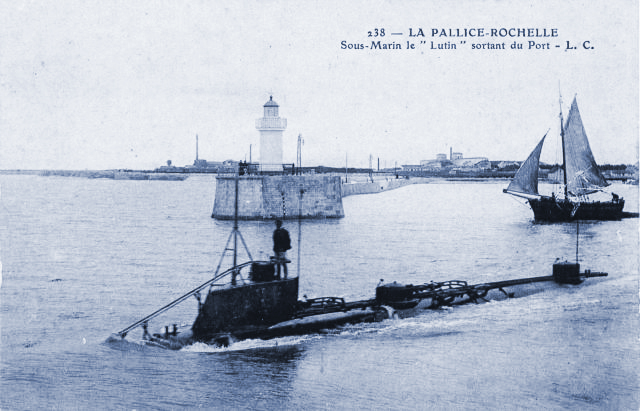
- Lutin leaving the port of La Pallice-Rochelle

History

France
- Name: Lutin
- Ordered: 27 September 1899
- Laid down: 27 February 1902
- Launched: 12 February 1903
- Commissioned: 1904
- Reclassified: As a target ship, 1908
- Stricken: 6 September 1907
- Fate: Sunk in an accident, 16 October 1906 and refloated; Sold for scrap, 2 August 1911

General characteristics
- Class & type: Farfadet-class submarine
- Displacement: 185 t (182 long tons) (surfaced); 202 t (199 long tons) (submerged)
- Length: 41.5 m (136 ft 2 in) (o/a)
- Beam: 2.9 m (9 ft 6 in)
- Draught: 2.7 m (8 ft 10 in)
- Installed power: 183 bhp (136 kW)
- Propulsion: 2 shafts; 2 electric motors
- Speed: 6.1 knots (11.3 km/h; 7.0 mph) (surfaced); 4.3 knots (8.0 km/h; 4.9 mph) (submerged)
- Range: 430 nmi (800 km; 490 mi) at 5 knots (9.3 km/h; 5.8 mph) (surfaced); 28 nmi (52 km; 32 mi) at 4.32 knots (8.00 km/h; 4.97 mph) (submerged)
- Complement: 14
- Armament: 4 × exterior 450 mm (17.7 in) torpedo launchers

Lutin was one of four Farfadet-class submarines built for the French Navy at the beginning of the 20th century. She differed from her sisters in that she had two propeller shafts and was slightly longer.

== Design and description ==
Derived from the Morse by Gabriel Maugas, the Farfadets were single-hulled, and powered by electric motors only, limiting their range and surface performance compared to the contemporary Sirène class. However they had variable-pitch propellers, developed by Maugas, obviating the need for a reversing engine.

The boats displaced 185 metric tons (182 long tons) on the surface and 202 metric tons (199 long tons) submerged. Lutin had an overall length of 41.5 meters (136 ft 2 in), a beam of 2.9 meters (9 ft 6 in), and a draft of 2.7 meters (8 ft 10 in). The crew of the submarines numbered 2 officers and 12 enlisted men. Lutin was powered by a pair of Sautter-Harlé electric motors providing a total of 300 metric horsepower (296 bhp; 221 kW), each driving one propeller shaft fitted with 1.22-meter (4 ft 0 in) propellers. They could reach a maximum speed of 6.1 knots (11.3 km/h; 7.0 mph) on the surface and 4.3 knots (8.0 km/h; 4.9 mph) underwater. The Farfadet class had a surface endurance of 430 nautical miles (800 km; 490 mi) at 5 knots (9.3 km/h; 5.8 mph) and a submerged endurance of 28 nmi (52 km; 32 mi) at 4.3 knots (8.0 km/h; 4.9 mph).

The boats were armed with four external 450-millimeter (17.7 in) Tissier torpedo launchers, two aimed forward and two aimed to the rear.

== Construction and career ==
Lutin was ordered on 27 September 1899 and was laid down on 27 February 1902 at Arsenal de Rochefort. She was launched on 12 February 1903 and was commissioned in 1904.

== Bibliography ==
- Garier, Gérard (1995). L'odyssée technique et humaine du sous-marin en France [The Technical and Human Odyssey of the Submarine in France: From Plongeur (1863) to Guêpe (1904)] (in French). Vol. 1: Du Plongeur (1863) aux Guêpe (1904). Marines édition. ISBN 2-909675-19-X.
- Roberts, Stephen S. (2021). French Warships in the Age of Steam 1859–1914: Design, Construction, Careers and Fates. Seaforth Publishing. ISBN 978-1-5267-4533-0.
- Stanglini, Ruggero & Cosentino, Michelle (2022). The French Fleet: Ships, Strategy and Operations, 1870-1918. Seaforth Publishing. ISBN 978-1-5267-0131-2.
