= Alexis-Vincent-Charles Berbiguier de Terre-Neuve du Thym =

French author and demonologist

Alexis-Vincent-Charles Berbiguier de Terre-Neuve du Thym or better known as M. Berbiguier (1765 – December 3, 1851) was a French author and demonologist who may have had psychosis.

He was born, and died, in Carpentras in Southern France, and was the heir to an estate, which he used to finance the publication of his unusual memoirs. He is remembered chiefly for his lengthy autobiography, Les farfadets ou Tous les démons ne sont pas de l'autre monde ("The Imps; or, All the demons are not from the other world"), originally published in three volumes between 1818 and 1820. The book was handsomely illustrated by a series of lithographs whose originals were sketched by Berbiguier himself.

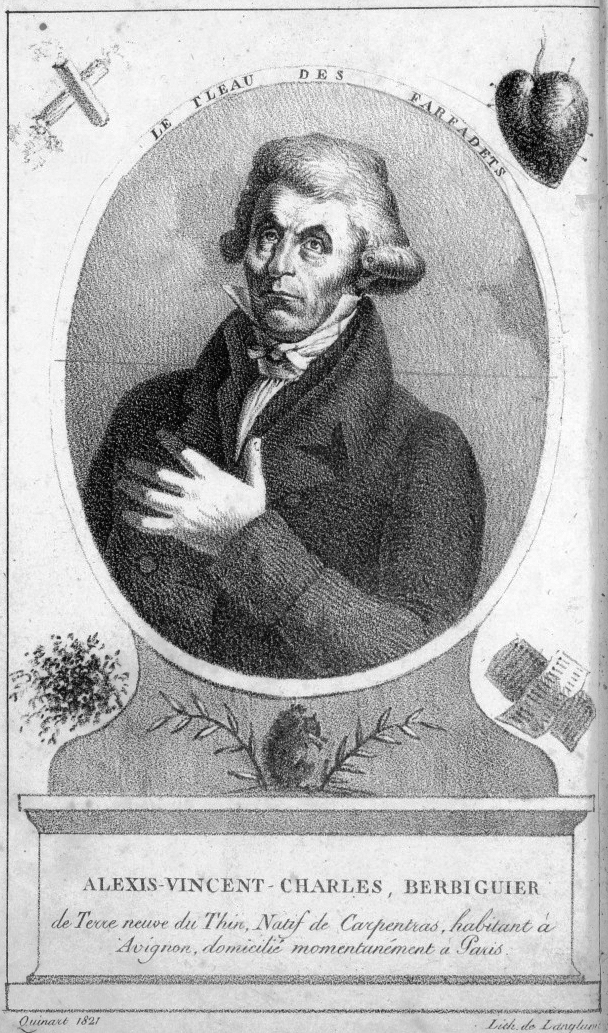
The frontispiece to Berbiguier's book. He has surrounded himself with the tools of his exercises: sulphur in the shape of a cross, thyme, a bull's heart pierced with thorns, and pins and needles.

French occultist Jacques Collin de Plancy used Berbiguier as his source for his own work, Dictionnaire Infernal, although Collin de Plancy had stated Berbiguier is unreliable at best. Collin de Plancy also nicknamed Berbiguier as "Don Quixote of demon".

== Struggle with the farfadets ==
This autobiography recounts Berbiguier's lifelong struggle with farfadets, "imps" or "goblins". He relates that these imps harassed him persistently ever since his unfortunate encounter with two "sibyls", or fortune tellers, whom he consulted in an idle moment in his youth. For this sin, he was delivered into the hands of impish tormentors. The imps continued to follow Berbiguier through several lengthy stays in Avignon and Paris. The chief imp among his tormentors was named Rhotomago; Rhotomago's immediate superior was Beelzebub himself. He alleged that he received, and answered, written correspondence from all of these Hellish dignitaries.

By research and experiment Berbiguier determined a number of herbal and other remedies that had the power to keep the imps in check. He wrote his book, he relates, to reveal his struggles and his methods to the world. In an eloquent if presumptuous dedication, he addresses himself to:

A TOUS LES EMPEREURS, ROIS, PRINCES, SOUVERAINS DES QUATRES PARTIES DU MONDE

Sires,

Pères des peuples, qui représentez sur la terre de Dieu de Paix et de consolation, qui est dans le ciel, réunissez vos efforts aux miens pour détruire l'influence des Démons, Sorciers et Farfadets, qui désolent les malheureux habitants de vos Etats. Vous voyez à vos pieds le plus infortuné des hommes; les tourments auxquels je suis en lutte depuis plus de vingt-trois ans sont les plus beaux titres que je puisse avoir à un de vos regards paternels.

Ah ! Il y a déjà longtemps que les persécutions diaboliques des Farfadets auraient eu un terme sur la terre, si quelqu'un de vos sujets avait eu le courage de vous les dévoiler. C'est pour les démasquer que je vous dédie mon ouvrage; vous ne serez pas insensibles à mes tourments, vous les ferez cesser dès qu'ils vous seront connus.

TO ALL THE EMPERORS, KINGS, PRINCES, AND SOVEREIGNS OF THE FOUR PARTS OF THE WORLD

Milords,
Fathers of nations, you who represent the heavenly God of peace and consolation on earth, unite your efforts to my own to destroy the power of Demons, Witches, and Imps, that devastate the unhappy dwellers of your countries. You see at your feet the most unfortunate of men; the torments with which I have struggled for these twenty-five years are the best titles that I can bear before your paternal gaze.
Ah! The diabolical persecutions of the Imps would have long since been ended on Earth, had one of your subjects had the courage to reveal them to you. It is in order to unmask them that I have dedicated my work to you, that you may not be heedless to my torments, and that you will work to end them now that they are known to you.

The autobiography relates Berbiguier's struggles with the imps. He was able to capture some of them, and confine them in bottles. Sulphur and thyme were two odours he found were effective to repel them. The book tells of an adventure he had with firefighters during a sojourn in Paris, where he attracted the alarmed notice of neighbours by burning sulphur to keep the imps at bay. Notwithstanding his efforts, the imps continued to tempt and torment him. The title de Terre-Neuve du Thym was self-bestowed; it means "of the New World of Thyme," and shows his hope that revealing his methods will renew the world and purge it of impish influences. He also bestowed upon himself the style Le Fléau des Farfadets, "the Scourge of the Imps."

== Psychiatric interpretation ==
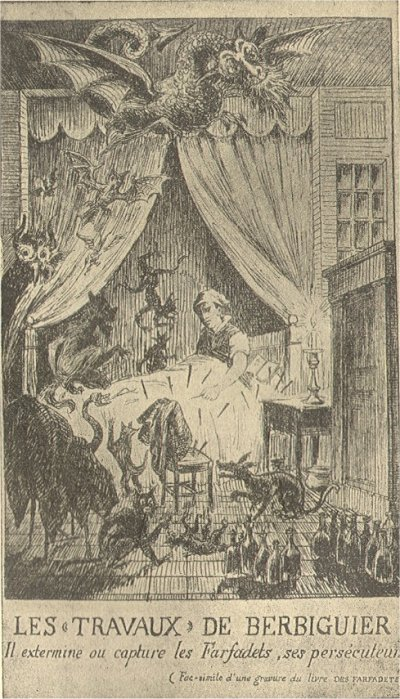
Imps torment Berbiguier in his bed.

As a result of these activities, he eventually was committed to the Hospice de la Salpêtrière under the care of Dr Philippe Pinel, a pioneer of psychotherapy; he was eventually released. Pinel was unable to achieve much for him, and appears in the book as a servant of the imps. An ultimate improvement in Berbiguier's mental state may be indicated by a report that he attempted to round up and destroy the surviving copies of his book, which as a result are quite scarce.

== Literary interpretations ==
Raymond Queneau and André Blavier considered Berbiguier to be a fou littéraire, a "literary madman," or rather, the literary equivalent of outsider art in France. Théophile Gautier used Berbiguier as a model for his fantastic story, Onuphrius; ou les vexations fantastiques d'un admirateur d'Hoffmann, and Gustave Flaubert similarly consulted Berbiguier's work for his tale of Bouvard et Pécuchet.
