= French submarine Argonaute (1905) =

Experimental French attack submarine built during WWI

Argonaute
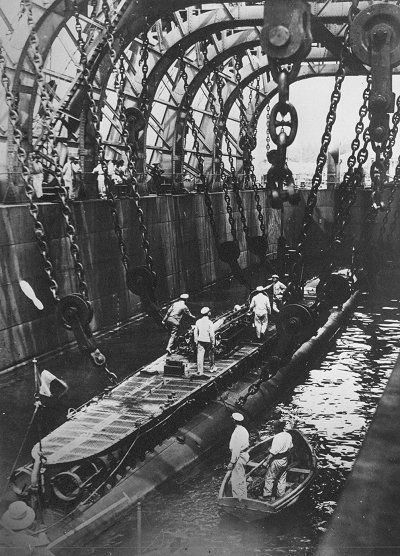
- Argonaute during testing in 1911

History

France
- Name: Argonaute
- Namesake: Argonauts
- Operator: French Navy
- Builder: Arsenal de Toulon
- Laid down: January 1903
- Launched: 28 November 1905
- Completed: January 1911
- Commissioned: January 1911
- Fate: Stricken on 20 May 1919

General characteristics
- Type: Submarine
- Displacement: 306 long tons (311 t) (surfaced); 409 long tons (416 t) (submerged)
- Length: 48.92 m (160 ft 6 in)
- Beam: 4.2 m (13 ft 9 in)
- Draught: 2.8 m (9 ft 2 in)
- Propulsion: 1 × triple expansion steam engine, 350 hp (261 kW); 1 × electric motor, 234 hp (174 kW)
- Speed: 10.25 knots (18.98 km/h) (surfaced); 6 knots (11 km/h) (submerged)
- Range: 1,076 nautical miles (1,993 km) at 8 knots (15 km/h); 45 nautical miles (83 km) at 5 knots (9.3 km/h) (submerged)
- Test depth: 30 m (98 ft)
- Complement: 22 men
- Armament: 2 × 450 mm (17.7 in) Drzewiecki drop collar torpedo launchers; 2 × 450 mm (17.7 in) torpedo cradles

The French submarine Argonaute was an experimental attack submarine built for the French Navy between 1903 and 1911. Initially named Omega, Argonaute was laid down in January 1903, launched in November 1905 and commissioned in 1911. She was essentially an experimental submarine, and although in service during World War I, saw no action. Argonaute was decommissioned in 1919.

== Design ==
Omega was designed by Émile Bertin and Emmanuel Petithomme. Initially, Omega was to be equipped with a special diesel engine (Note: Under water the diesel engine would have to work on compressed air.) to power the submarine both on the surface and submerged, but the failure of the concept on the French submarine Z forced the constructors to install a steam engine and an electric motor instead.

Argonaute had a surfaced displacement of 306 long tons (311 tonnes) and a submerged displacement of 409 long tons (416 t). Her dimensions were 48.92 metres (160 feet 6 inches) long, with a beam of 4.2 m (13 ft 9 in) and a draught of 2.8 m (9 ft 2 in). She had a single shaft powered by one triple expansion steam engine of 350 horsepower (261 kilowatts) with steam from one boiler (Note: Conway's All The World's Fighting Ships 1906–1921 states that she had two boilers.) and an electric motor which produced 234 hp (174 kW) for submerged propulsion. The maximum speed was 10.25 knots (18.98 kilometres per hour; 11.80 miles per hour) on the surface and 6 knots (11 km/h; 6.9 mph) while submerged with a surfaced range of 1,076 nautical miles (1,993 kilometres; 1,238 miles) at 8 knots (15 km/h) and a submerged range of 45 nautical miles (83 km) at 5 knots (9.3 km/h). Her complement was 22 men.

The submarine's armament comprised two 450 mm (17.7 in) bow torpedo tubes, two 450 mm (17.7 in) Drzewiecki drop collar torpedo launchers and two torpedoes in external cradles.

== Construction and career ==
Omega was built in the Arsenal de Toulon. She was laid down in January 1903 and was launched on 28 November 1905. On 27 September 1910, the ship was renamed "Argonaute", and was commissioned in January 1911.

Argonaute served in the Mediterranean Sea until 20 May 1919, when it was struck from the Navy list.
