= Farfadet =

Folklore creature in France

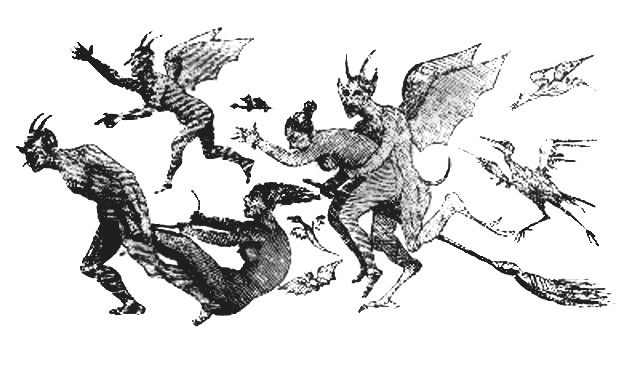
An artist's impression of Farfadets

Farfadets are creatures of French folklore. The word translates variously as "Sprite", "Imp", "Brownie", or "Leprechaun", though they also resemble the Pixies of Britain's West Country. The term is in general use throughout France, though the creature is local particularly to the Vendée and Poitou regions. Farfadets also feature in Occitan mythology, particularly in Provence, where they are known as fadets.

== Description ==
Farfadets are described as being small (around a half-meter tall), wrinkled, and brown-skinned; they generally wear tattered brown clothing, or go naked. Farfadets are said to be helpful rather than malicious, though they are playful and sometimes mischievous. They like to tend horses, which they will groom, or weave ringlets into their manes. They live in woodlands, but will also attach themselves to a neighbouring farm or homestead, and complete odd tasks in the fields, in return for a bowl of milk or cream left on the doorstep at night. However they can be frightened away by too much kindness, such as leaving new clothes out for them.

== A warning ==
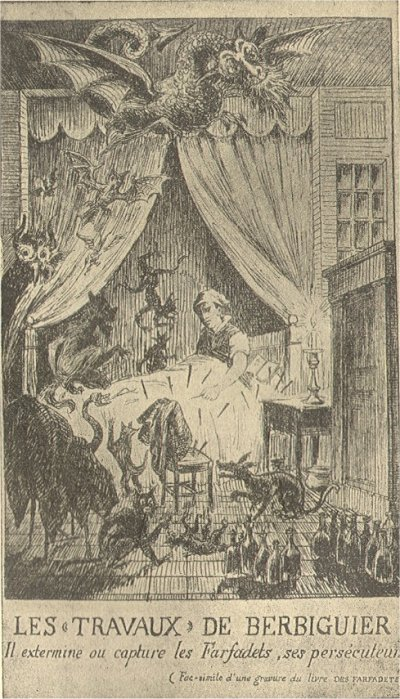
An illustration from Berbiguier's book

Despite this reputation, the 18th century French writer AVC Berbiguer believed he was tormented by them, and wrote extensively about them and their depredations. In 1821 he was constrained to publish an autobiography, Les Farfadets ou Tous les démons ne sont pas de l'autre monde ("The Imps or All the demons are not from the other world"), which was intended as a warning "To all the Emperors, Kings, Princes and Sovereigns of the Four Parts of the World".

== See also ==
In French, "farfadet" can also refer to

- A transient luminous event, known in English as a "sprite"
- The junior section of the Scouts and Guides of France, the equivalent to the Beavers of Commonwealth countries
- An early submarine of the French Navy, the name ship of its class, which was lost with its crew in 1905
