= Château de Fromental =

Castle in France

Coordinates: 46.1600°N 1.3950°E

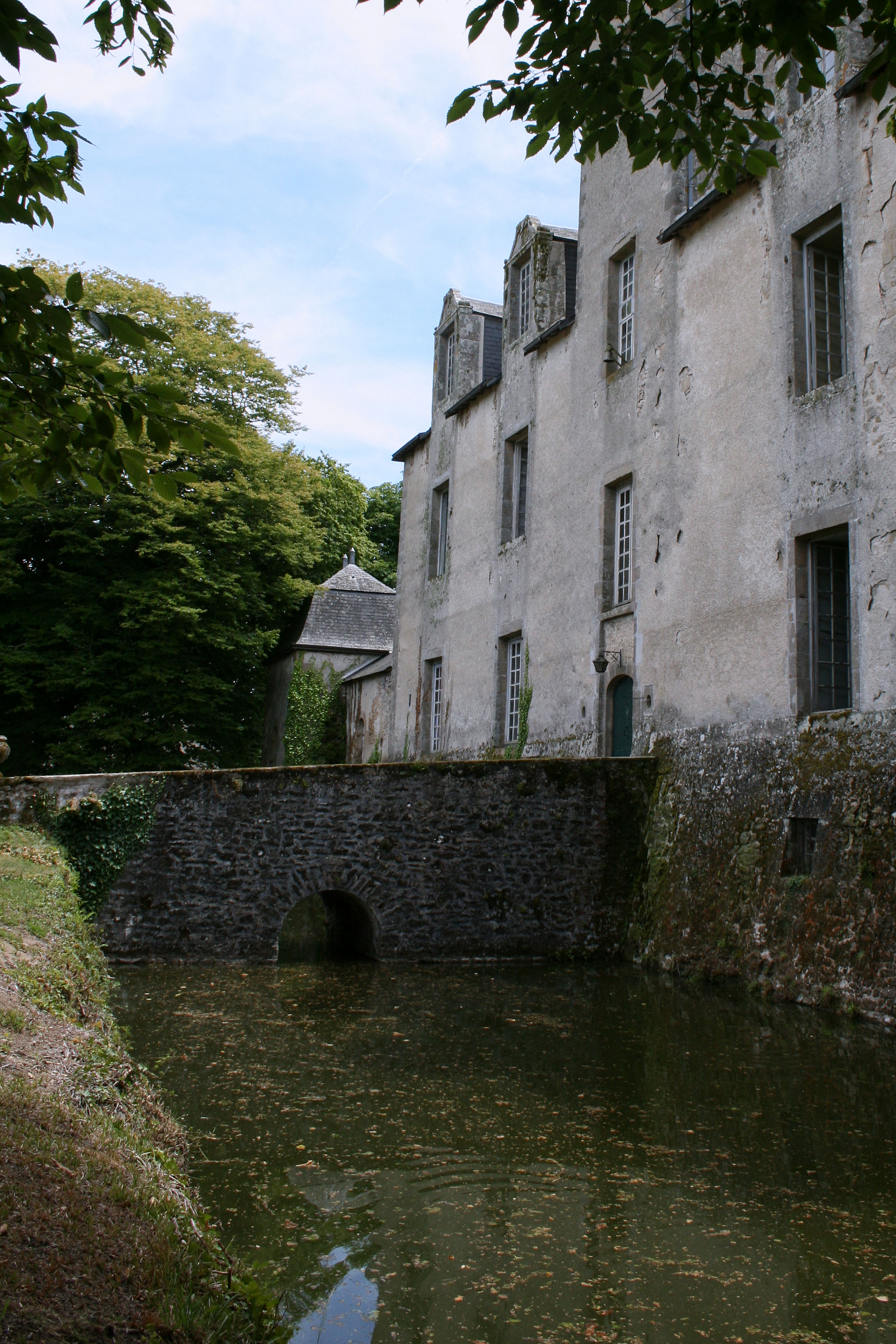
- Interactive map of Château de Fromental

General information
- Location: France
- Completed: 17th century

The Château de Fromental is an historic château in Fromental, Haute-Vienne, France. It was built in the 17th century. It has been listed as an official historical monument since June 8, 1925.
