= French submarine Z =

Experimental Navy submarine, launched 1904

Z
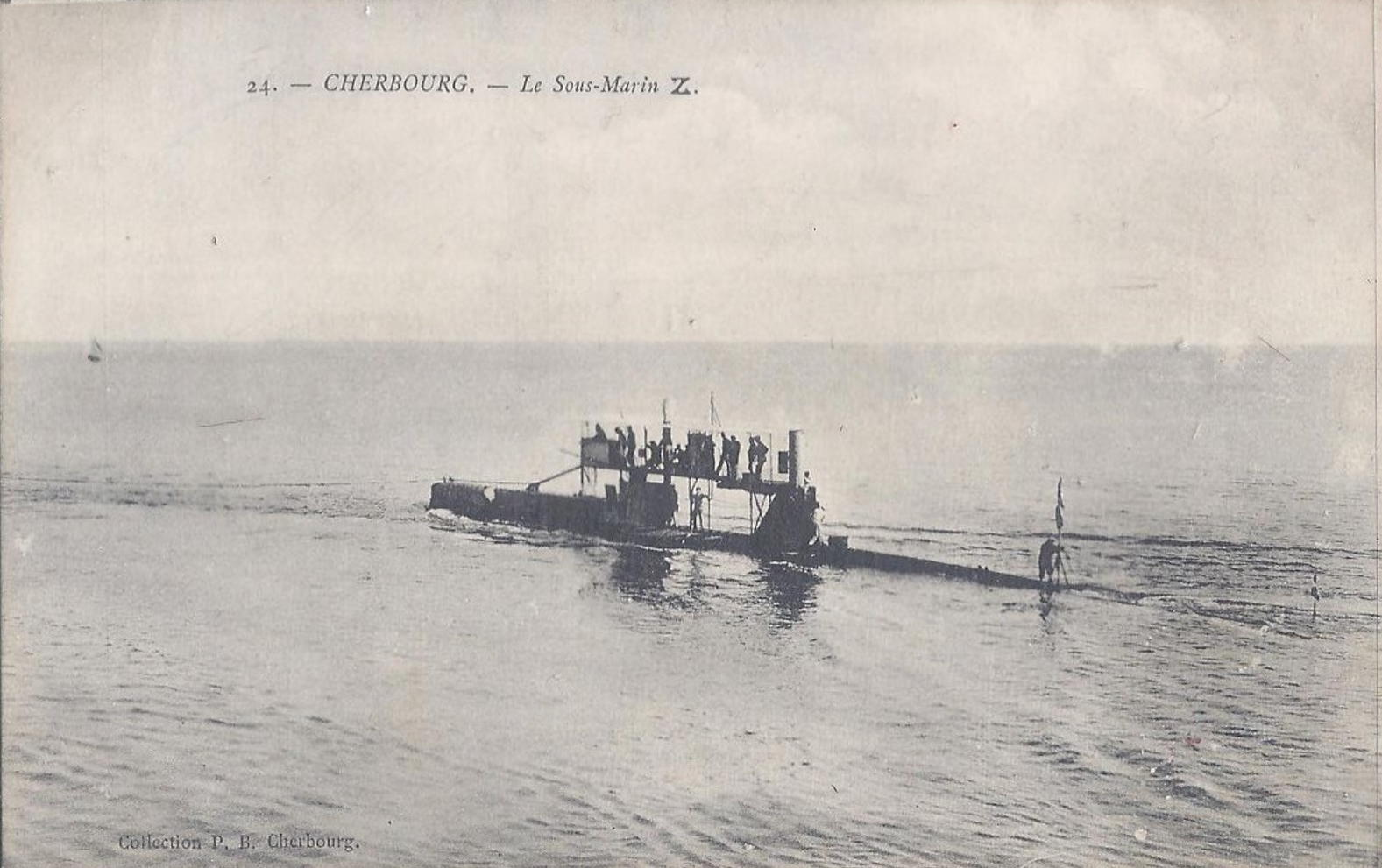
- Z being towed, c. 1905

Class overview
- Name: Z
- Operators: French Navy
- Preceded by: Naïade class
- Succeeded by: Y
- Built: 1902–1905
- In service: 1905–1909
- Completed: 1

History
- Ordered: 10 June 1901
- Builder: Arsenal de Rochefort
- Laid down: 16 August 1902
- Launched: 28 March 1904
- Completed: 1905?
- Commissioned: 3 June 1904 (for trials)
- Decommissioned: 1 March 1909
- Stricken: 9 March 1910
- Fate: Sold for scrap, 9 July 1911

General characteristics
- Type: Submarine
- Displacement: 202 long tons (205 t) (surfaced); 222 long tons (226 t) (submerged)
- Length: 42.03 m (137 ft 11 in)
- Beam: 2.98 m (9 ft 9 in)
- Draught: 2.82 m (9 ft 3 in)
- Installed power: 1 × diesel engine, 181 hp (135 kW); 1 × electric motor, 180 hp (134 kW)
- Propulsion: 1 × variable-pitch propeller
- Speed: 7.9 knots (14.6 km/h; 9.1 mph) (surfaced); 5.9 knots (10.9 km/h; 6.8 mph) (submerged)
- Range: 500 nmi (930 km; 580 mi) at 5 knots (9.3 km/h; 5.8 mph); 45 nmi (83 km; 52 mi) at 4 knots (7.4 km/h; 4.6 mph) (submerged)
- Complement: 16 men
- Armament: 2 × 450 mm (17.7 in) bow torpedo tubes

The French submarine Z was an experimental submarine built for the French Navy (Marine nationale) in the first decade of the 20th century. Designed by Gabriel Maugas, it was the first French submarine to be completed with a diesel engine and the only one with four sets of diving planes. It was commissioned for its sea trials in 1904, although its propulsion machinery was unreliable and it was never fit for service with the fleet. It may have been completed in 1905. An extensive refit for Z was planned in 1907, but this was cancelled as too expensive. Disposal of the submarine was first proposed the following year, although it was not stricken from the navy list until 1910. Z was sold for scrap in 1911.

== Background and description ==
Z was a single-hull design by Gabriel Maugas based on the hull of the all-electric Farfadet-class submarine that was modified to use a diesel engine on the surface and to recharge its batteries. He estimated a maximum speed on the surface of 12 knots (22 km/h; 14 mph) and 7 knots (13 km/h; 8.1 mph) submerged, but the boat was considerably slower on the surface than he anticipated.

The submarine had a surfaced displacement of 202 long tons (205 t) and a submerged displacement of 222 long tons (226 t). It had an overall length of 42.03 metres (137 ft 11 in), with a beam of 2.98 metres (9 ft 9 in) and a draught of 2.82 metres (9 ft 3 in). Like the Farfadets, most of its ballast tanks were inside the hull and it was fitted with a pair of side-thrusting propellers (évolueurs) on the stern to help steering that were geared to the propeller shaft. Z had two rudders, one each above and below the stern and was the only French submarine to be fitted with four sets of diving planes. Unlike the Farfadets, the boat was fitted with a free-flooding forward ballast tank above the hull and had a lengthy walking deck 2.3 metres (7 ft 7 in) above the hull that extended from forward of its conning tower to the telescoping funnel. A lower walking deck was installed aft of the funnel after 1905. Its crew consisted of 2 officers and 14 ratings. Its armament comprised two 450-millimetre (17.7 in) torpedo tubes side-by-side in the bow.

Z was equipped with a single variable-pitch propeller that was driven on the surface by a diesel engine built by Sautter-Harlé; ordered on 8 May 1901, it was one of the earliest diesels built in France. Based on the experimental engine installed on the canal barge Petit Pierre, it had two vertical cylinder with the flywheel located between them. Although rated at 120 horsepower (89 kW), it only produced 80 horsepower (60 kW) during its initial testing, because of "excessive torsional vibration in the shaft connecting the two separate cylinder assemblies". It was later replaced by a more powerful 190-horsepower (142 kW) model. An electric motor was used underwater. During the boat's comparative trials against the submarine Aigrette in early 1905, Z reached a speed of 7.9 knots (14.6 km/h; 9.1 mph) from 181 horsepower (135 kW) on the surface and 5.9 knots (10.9 km/h; 6.8 mph) from 180 horsepower (134 kW) while submerged. The submarine had a designed surfaced range of 500 nautical miles (930 km; 580 mi) at 5 knots (9.3 km/h; 5.8 mph) and a submerged range of 45 nautical miles (83 km; 52 mi) at 4 knots (7.4 km/h; 4.6 mph).

== Construction and career ==
Z was ordered with the budget number Q36 from the Arsenal de Rochefort on 10 June 1901 and was laid down on 16 August 1902. When its propellers were delivered, their blades were judged defective, but the navy decided to accept them on 4 January 1904 when the manufacturer offered to lower their price. The boat was launched on 28 March and it was authorized to be commissioned for comparative trials on 3 June 1904, although it is uncertain if it was ever fully in commission. Z cost F779,300. The submarine was ordered on the following day to prepare for trials with Aigrette at the Arsenal de Cherbourg and arrived there on 19 July. The initial series of trials were prolonged when Z collided with the protected cruiser Chasseloup-Laubat on 13 October while conducting speed trials. The submarine's repairs were completed on 12 December. Gaston Thomson, the Navy Minister, ordered that the testing be repeated and four days of intensive trials were held on 10–15 March 1905, although they were not fully completed until 2 May. They revealed that Aigrette outperformed Z in every way; it was faster on the surface and underwater, more manoeuverable, dived faster and handled bad weather better.

Z sheared her propeller shaft on 24 May. It remained unrepaired while a study was ordered to reconfigure her propulsion system on 7 July. The diesel engine broke on 1 June 1906 and its removal was requested on 23 June. Preparations for the installation of a new propulsion system began on 20 September. The navy decided to thoroughly refit the submarine on 26 April 1907; this involved repairing the propeller shaft and propellers while replacing the diesel engine with a pair of kerosene-fuelled motor-generators converted by Sautter-Harlé from 120-horsepower (89 kW) diesels intended for the cancelled Guêpe-class submarines. Other issues that needed to be addressed were that Z had the same thin walls in its internal ballast tanks as the Farfadet-class submarines and these had to be reinforced to prevent their rupture if an intake valve jammed in the open position, as had caused the loss of the submarine Lutin in 1906 and that its batteries needed to be replaced. Reinforcing the ballast tanks was estimated to cost approximately half the value of the submarine and replacing the battery would cost more than that. The refit was suspended and the boat was nominated for condemnation on 26 February 1908. Z was decommissioned on 1 March 1909 and was struck from the navy list on 9 March 1910. The hulk was sold for scrap on 8 November 1911.

== See also ==
- List of submarines of France

== Bibliography ==
- Cummins, C. Lyle Jr. (1993). Diesel's Engine. Vol. 1: From Conception to 1918. Wilsonville, Oregon: Carnot Press. ISBN 0-917308-03-4.
- Garier, Gérard (1995). L'odyssée technique et humaine du sous-marin en France [The Technical and Human Odyssey of the Submarine in France] (in French). Vol. 1: Du Plongeur (1863) aux Guêpe (1904). Bourg-en-Bresse, France: Marines édition. ISBN 2-909675-19-X.
- Roberts, Stephen S. (2021). French Warships in the Age of Steam 1859–1914: Design, Construction, Careers and Fates. Barnsley, UK: Seaforth Publishing. ISBN 978-1-5267-4533-0.
- Smigielski, Adam (1985). "France". In Gray, Randal (ed.). Conway's All the World's Fighting Ships 1906–1921. Annapolis, Maryland: Naval Institute Press. pp. 190–220. ISBN 0-870219-07-3.
