= French submarine Cigogne =

Cigogne
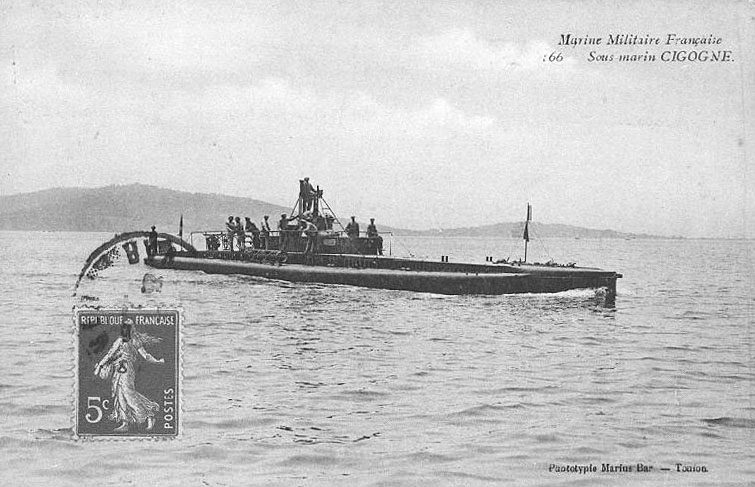
- Cigogne, date unknown

History

France
- Name: Cigogne
- Namesake: Ciconia
- Operator: French Navy
- Ordered: 13 May 1902
- Builder: Arsenal de Toulon
- Laid down: 13 May 1902
- Launched: 11 November 1904
- Commissioned: 18 July 1906
- Fate: Sold for scrap at Toulon in April 1920

General characteristics
- Type: Submarine
- Displacement: 178 long tons (181 t) (surfaced); 253 long tons (257 t) (submerged)
- Length: 35.9 m (117 ft 9 in)
- Beam: 4.04 m (13 ft 3 in)
- Draught: 2.63 m (8 ft 8 in)
- Propulsion: 1 × diesel engine, 150 hp (112 kW); 1 × electric motor, 130 hp (97 kW)
- Speed: 9.3 knots (17.2 km/h) (surfaced); 6.2 knots (11.5 km/h) (submerged)
- Range: 1,300 nautical miles (2,400 km) at 8 knots (15 km/h); 65 nautical miles (120 km) at 3.8 knots (7.0 km/h) (submerged)
- Complement: 14 men
- Armament: 2 × 450 mm (17.7 in) Drzewiecki drop collar torpedo launchers; 2 × 450 mm (17.7 in) torpedo cradles

Cigogne was the second of two Aigrette-class submarines built for the French Navy between 1903 and 1905. Laid down in May 1902, she was launched in November 1904 and commissioned in July 1906. She was an essentially experimental submarine, and although in service during World War I, saw no action. The class was designed by Maxime Laubeuf and used Drzewiecki drop collar launchers and external cradles to launch torpedoes.

== Design ==
Cigogne had a surfaced displacement of 178 long tons (181 tonnes) and a submerged displacement of 253 long tons (257 t). Her dimensions were 35.9 metres (117 feet 9 inches) long, with a beam of 4.04 m (13 ft 3 in) and a draught of 2.63 m (8 ft 8 in). She had a single shaft powered by one diesel engine for surface running of 150 hp (112 kW) and an electric motor which produced 130 horsepower (97 kilowatts) for submerged propulsion. The maximum speed was 9.3 knots (17.2 kilometres per hour; 10.7 miles per hour) on the surface and 6.2 knots (11.5 km/h; 7.1 mph) while submerged with a surfaced range of 1,300 nautical miles (2,400 kilometres; 1,500 miles) at 8 knots (15 km/h) and a submerged range of 65 nautical miles (120 km) at 3.8 knots (7.0 km/h). Her complement was 14 men.

== Construction and career ==
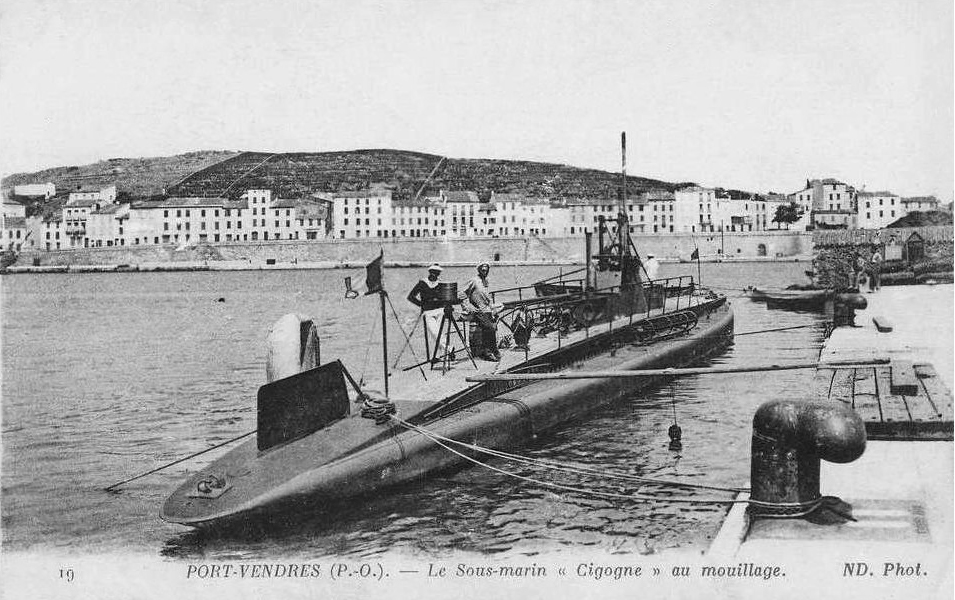
Cigogne at Port-Vendres

Cigogne was laid down on 13 May 1902, launched on 11 November 1904 and commissioned on 18 July 1906.

Cigogne was retired from service on 12 November 1919 and sold for scrap at Toulon on 14 April 1920.

== Citations ==
- Fontenoy, Paul E. (2007). Submarines: An Illustrated History of Their Impact. ABC-CLIO Publishing. ISBN 978-1-85109-563-6.
- Garier, Gérard (1995). Du Plongeur (1863) aux Guêpe (1904) [From Plongeur (1863) to Guêpe (1904)]. L'odyssée technique et humaine du sous-marin en France (in French). Vol. 1. Bourg-en-Bresse, France: Marines édition. ISBN 2-909675-19-X.
- Roberts, Stephen S. (2021). French Warships in the Age of Steam 1859–1914: Design, Construction, Careers and Fates. Barnsley, UK: Seaforth Publishing. ISBN 978-1-5267-4533-0.
- Smigielski, Adam (1985). "France". In Gray, Randal (ed.). Conway's All the World's Fighting Ships 1906–1921. Annapolis, Maryland: Naval Institute Press. pp. 190–220. ISBN 0-87021-907-3.
