= Fromental =

- Commune
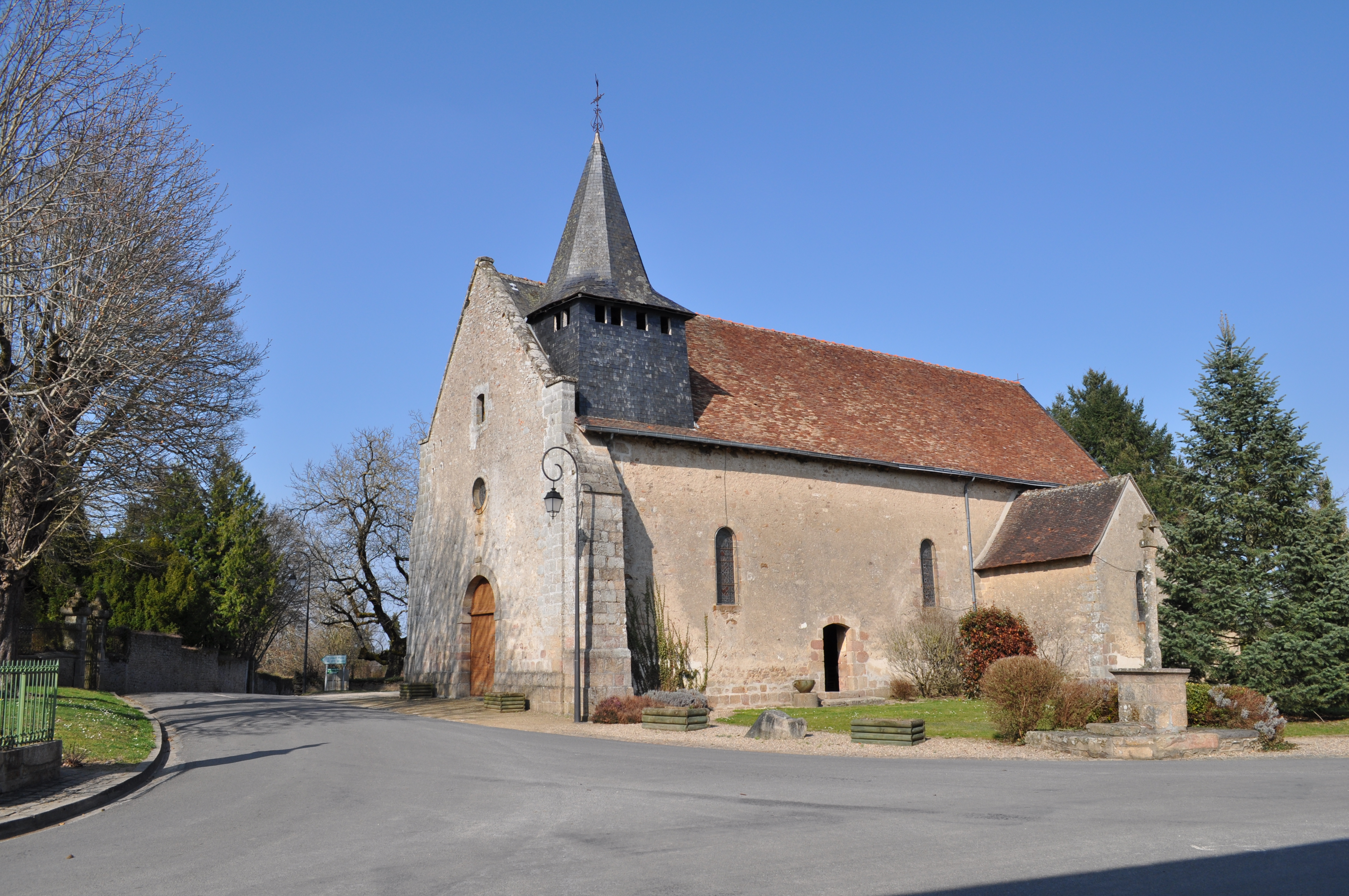
- The church in Fromental

- Coat of arms
- Location of Fromental
- Location within France Location within Nouvelle-Aquitaine
- Coordinates: 46°09′36″N 1°23′50″E
- Country: France
- Region: Nouvelle-Aquitaine
- Department: Haute-Vienne
- Arrondissement: Bellac
- Canton: Ambazac

Government
  - Mayor (2023–2026): Thierry Paufique
- Area^{1}: 22.65 km^{2} (8.75 sq mi)
- Highest elevation: 430 m (1,410 ft)
- Lowest elevation: 279 m (915 ft)
- Population (2023): 524
  - Density: 23.1/km^{2} (59.9/sq mi)
- Time zone: UTC+01:00 (CET)
  - Summer (DST): UTC+02:00 (CEST)
- INSEE/Postal code: 87068 /87250
- ^{1} French Land Register data, which excludes lakes, ponds, glaciers > 1 km^{2} (0.386 sq mi or 247 acres) and river estuaries.

Fromental (French pronunciation: [fʁɔmɑ̃tal]; Occitan: Fromentau) is a commune in the Haute-Vienne department in the Nouvelle-Aquitaine region in west-central France.

== Geography ==
The river Semme flows through the commune's northern part and forms part of its northern and western borders.

Inhabitants are known as Fromentaux in French.

== See also ==
- Château de Fromental
- Communes of the Haute-Vienne department
