= USS Gulfport (AK-5) =

Cargo ship of the United States Navy

History

German Empire
- Name: Andree Rickmers; Locksun
- Owner: North German Lloyd SS Co.
- Builder: Rickmers Aktien Gesellschaft, Bremerhaven, German Empire
- Launched: 24 May 1902
- Fate: Seized at Pearl Harbor, Territory of Hawaii, 1917
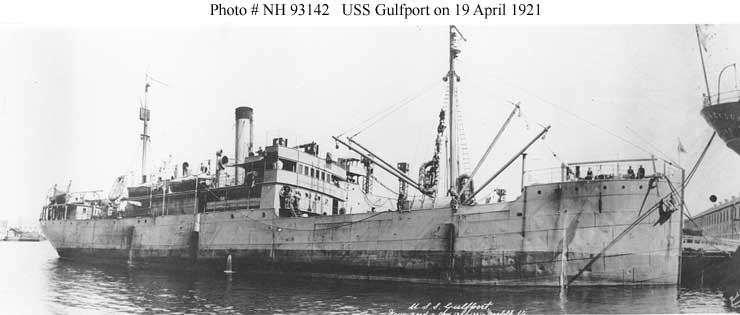
- USS Gulfport (AK-5) at Norfolk Navy Yard, Portsmouth, Virginia, 19 April 1921.

United States
- Name: Gulfport
- Namesake: Gulfport, Mississippi
- Acquired: 1917
- Commissioned: 1 September 1917
- Decommissioned: 3 March 1922
- Reclassified: 17 July 1920
- Stricken: date unknown
- Identification: Hull symbol: SP-2989; Hull symbol: AK-5
- Fate: Sold, 25 May 1922, to Moore & McCormack Inc.

General characteristics
- Displacement: 3,800 t (3,700 long tons)
- Length: 267 ft 4 in (81.48 m)
- Beam: 37 ft 2 in (11.33 m)
- Draught: 18 ft (5.5 m)
- Propulsion: steam
- Speed: 7.5 kn (13.9 km/h; 8.6 mph)
- Complement: 52
- Armament: 1 × 4 in (100 mm) gun mount; 1 × 6-pounder

USS Gulfport (AK-5) was a cargo ship acquired by the U.S. Navy for service in World War I.

== Acquiring a captured German freighter ==
Gulfport, formerly SS Locksun, ex-SS Andree Rickmers, was built at Bremerhaven, Germany, in 1902 by Rickmers Aktiengesellschaft and was owned by the German Norddeutscher Lloyd Steamship Lines Co. In Pearl Harbor, when the United States entered World War I, she was seized by government orders and converted to a cargo transport at the Honolulu Navy Yard. She was commissioned on 1 September, 1917, in Honolulu.

== World War I North Atlantic operations ==
In company with four submarines, Gulfport sailed from Hawaii on 30 October 1917, reaching New York 28 January 1918 via San Diego, California, Corinto, Nicaragua, Balboa, Key West, Florida, and Norfolk, Virginia. At New York she discharged her cargo, primarily pineapple, and was attached to the Naval Overseas Transportation Service.

== Post-war operations ==
Until she decommissioned in 1922, Gulfport served as a cargo ship linking New York and Charleston with various Caribbean ports, particularly Guantanamo, Cuba; St. Thomas, Virgin Islands; Port-au-Prince, Haiti; and Santo Domingo, Dominican Republic. During this period she made a total of 23 round trips to the West Indies, carrying oil and other necessary supplies to American troops based there and frequently returning with a cargo of sugar from the islands. Gulfport was detached from Naval Overseas Transportation Service on 10 October 1919 and placed under the military jurisdiction of the Commandant, 6th Naval District, Charleston, for duty in the West Indies Freight Service.

== Last voyage and decommissioning ==
Gulfport completed her last voyage to the Caribbean on 25 November 1921 as she returned to New York; there she decommissioned 3 March 1922 at the Brooklyn Navy Yard and was sold to Moore & McCormack Inc. of New York on 25 July 1922.

== Military awards and honors ==
Her crew was authorized the following medals:

- World War I Victory Medal (with Transport clasp)
- Haitian Campaign Medal
