= USS J. M. Guffey =

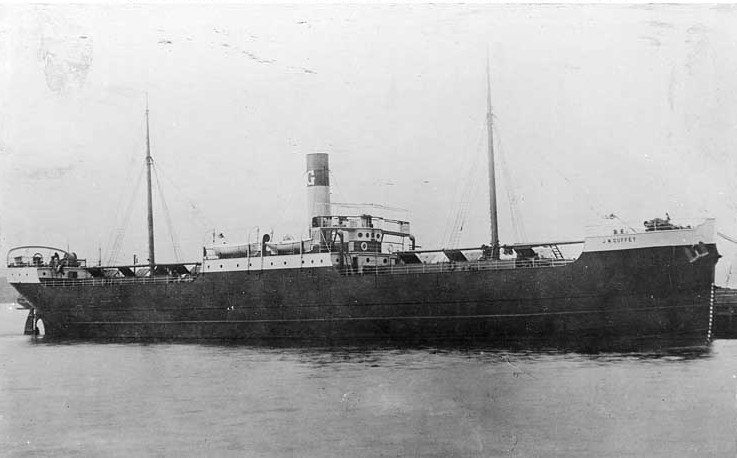
- SS J. M. Guffey in a photo taken by her builder on 17 March 1902 at the time of her completion

History

United States
- Name: USS J. M. Guffey
- Namesake: James M. Guffey
- Owner: Gulf Refining Company, Pittsburgh, Pennsylvania
- Builder: New York Shipbuilding Company, Camden, New Jersey
- Launched: 4 May 1901
- Completed: 1902
- Acquired: by the Navy 14 October 1918
- Commissioned: 14 October 1918 at Invergorden, Scotland
- Decommissioned: 17 June 1919 in Philadelphia, Pennsylvania
- Stricken: 1919
- Fate: Transferred, 17 June 1919 to the United States Shipping Board for return to her owners
- Notes: Renamed SS Meloria in 1926

General characteristics
- Type: Tanker
- Displacement: 5,500 long tons (5,600 t)
- Length: 292 ft 2 in (89.05 m)
- Beam: 40 ft 2 in (12.24 m)
- Draft: 22 ft (6.7 m)
- Speed: 11 knots (20 km/h; 13 mph)

USS J. M. Guffey (ID 1279) was a commercial tanker chartered by the U.S. Navy during World War I. However, because her master declined to remain with the ship during wartime, the ship was taken over by the U.S. Navy. She operated out of Scotland until war's end, and then was returned to the United States, decommissioned, and was returned to her owner.

== Construction and career ==
The Dollar Steamship Company ordered the vessel as a freighter named MS Dollar. However, J. M. Guffey, measuring 2,520 gross register tons (GRT) with a displacement of 5,500 long tons (5,600 t), was converted to a tanker during construction. She was built at Camden, New Jersey, in 1902 by the New York Shipbuilding Company, and was the first ship built by that company. She was named after Pennsylvania oilman and politician James M. Guffey.

In 1918 the tanker was operating on bareboat charter on behalf of the British Ministry of War Transport, and a request was made that she be manned by the U.S. Navy as her present master did not desire to remain with the ship and the remaining crew members were willing to enroll in the U. S. Naval Reserve Force.

The ship was therefore commissioned at Invergorden, Scotland, on 14 October 1918 as USS J. M. Guffey (ID # 1279). J. M. Guffey operated out of Invergorden replenishing the oil supplies until 24 January 1919 when—after delaying her departure until she received new boiler tubes—she sailed for the United States. She remained in St. John's, Newfoundland, for six weeks before arriving Philadelphia, Pennsylvania on 14 April. The ship had to put into St. John's because her boilers were leaking badly, and she remained there until leaving on 4 April for Philadelphia accompanied by the tug USS Iroquois.

After extensive repairs J. M. Guffey was decommissioned on 17 June 1919 and delivered to the U.S. Shipping Board for return to her owners, the Gulf Refining Company of Pittsburgh, Pennsylvania. The vessel was renamed Meloria in 1926 and was scrapped at Venice, Italy, in 1935.
