= USS Asp (YFB-1) =

History

United States
- Name: USS Asp
- Launched: 1902
- Commissioned: 17 April 1917
- Reclassified: YFB-1, July 1920
- Fate: Sold, 24 March 1923

General characteristics
- Type: Patrol boat
- Length: 72 ft (22 m)
- Beam: 12 ft (4 m)

USS Asp (YFB-1) was originally named Nahma. It was a wooden motor boat built in New Orleans, Louisiana, in 1902. Acquired by the United States Navy the same year, she was assigned to the Louisiana Naval Militia, which she served until the outbreak of World War I.

Renamed Asp, she was placed in service, 17 April 1917, to operate in the New Orleans area as both a motor patrol boat and a ferry. After the Armistice, Asp continued to serve the 8th Naval District. Designated YFB-1 in July 1920, she was placed out of service and sold on 24 March 1923.
