= French submarine Aigrette =

Lead boat of the Aigrette-class submarines

Aigrette
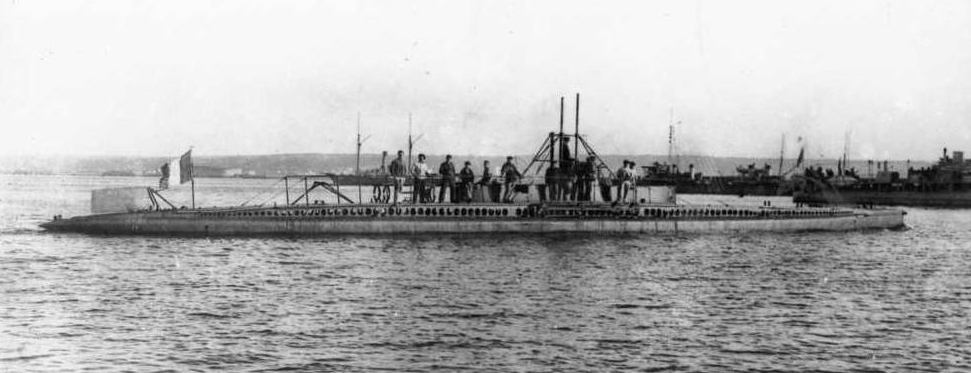
- Aigrette, date unknown

History

France
- Name: Aigrette
- Namesake: Egret
- Operator: French Navy
- Ordered: 13 May 1902
- Builder: Arsenal de Toulon
- Way number: 038
- Laid down: 13 May 1902
- Launched: 24 February 1904
- Commissioned: 1908
- Fate: Sold for scrap at Toulon in April 1920

General characteristics
- Type: Submarine
- Displacement: 178 long tons (181 t) (surfaced); 253 long tons (257 t) (submerged)
- Length: 35.9 m (117 ft 9 in)
- Beam: 4.04 m (13 ft 3 in)
- Draught: 2.63 m (8 ft 8 in)
- Propulsion: 1 × diesel engine, 150 hp (112 kW); 1 × electric motor, 130 hp (97 kW)
- Speed: 9.3 knots (17.2 km/h) (surfaced); 6.2 knots (11.5 km/h) (submerged)
- Range: 1,300 nautical miles (2,400 km) at 8 knots (15 km/h); 65 nautical miles (120 km) at 3.8 knots (7.0 km/h) (submerged)
- Test depth: 30 m (98 ft)
- Complement: 14 men
- Armament: 2 × 450 mm (17.7 in) Drzewiecki drop collar torpedo launchers; 2 × 450 mm (17.7 in) torpedo cradles

Aigrette was the lead boat of the Aigrette-class submarines built for the French Navy between 1902 and 1905. Laid down in May 1902, she was launched in February 1904 and commissioned in 1908. She was essentially an experimental submarine, and although in service during World War I, saw no action. The class was designed by Maxime Laubeuf and used Drzewiecki drop collar launchers and external cradles to launch torpedoes.

== Design ==
Aigrette had a surfaced displacement of 178 long tons (181 tonnes) and a submerged displacement of 253 long tons (257 t). Her dimensions were 35.9 metres (117 feet 9 inches) long, with a beam of 4.04 m (13 ft 3 in) and a draught of 2.63 m (8 ft 8 in). She had a single shaft powered by one diesel engine for surface running of 150 horsepower (112 kilowatts) and an electric motor which produced 130 hp (97 kW) for submerged propulsion. The maximum speed was 9.3 knots (17.2 kilometres per hour; 10.7 miles per hour) on the surface and 6.2 knots (11.5 km/h; 7.1 mph) while submerged with a surfaced range of 1,300 nautical miles (2,400 kilometres; 1,500 miles) at 8 knots (15 km/h) and a submerged range of 65 nautical miles (120 km) at 3.8 knots (7.0 km/h). Her complement was 14 men.

The submarines armament comprised two 450 mm (17.7 in) Drzewiecki drop collar torpedo launchers and two 450 mm (17.7 in) torpedoes in external cradles.

== Construction and career ==
Aigrette was ordered and laid down on 13 May 1902, launched in February 1904 and commissioned in 1908. She was the first submersible in the world to be launched which used a diesel engine for surface running although the experimental submarine Z was both the first to be ordered and commissioned.

On 5 October 1904, hydrogen leaked out of the submarine's battery causing parts of it to explode, and on 13 May 1908, she was sent to Toulon to serve as a training boat.

During World War I, Aigrette served in defensive positions in Brest and in Cherbourg. In 1916, Aigrette participated in successful tests for underwater cutting of anti-submarine nets, but the result were never implemented in a warship before the end of the war.

Aigrette was retired from service on 12 November 1919 and sold for scrap at Toulon on 14 April 1920.

== See also ==
- List of submarines of France

== Citations ==
- Fontenoy, Paul E. (2007). Submarines: An Illustrated History of Their Impact. ABC-CLIO Publishing. ISBN 978-1-85109-563-6.
- Garier, Gérard (1995). Du Plongeur (1863) aux Guêpe (1904) [From Plongeur (1863) to Guêpe (1904)]. L'odyssée technique et humaine du sous-marin en France (in French). Vol. 1. Bourg-en-Bresse, France: Marines édition. ISBN 2-909675-19-X.
- Roberts, Stephen S. (2021). French Warships in the Age of Steam 1859–1914: Design, Construction, Careers and Fates. Barnsley, UK: Seaforth Publishing. ISBN 978-1-5267-4533-0.
- Smigielski, Adam (1985). "France". In Gray, Randal (ed.). Conway's All the World's Fighting Ships 1906–1921. Annapolis, Maryland: Naval Institute Press. pp. 190–220. ISBN 0-87021-907-3.
