= Aigrette-class submarine =

French navy submarine class of the early 20th century

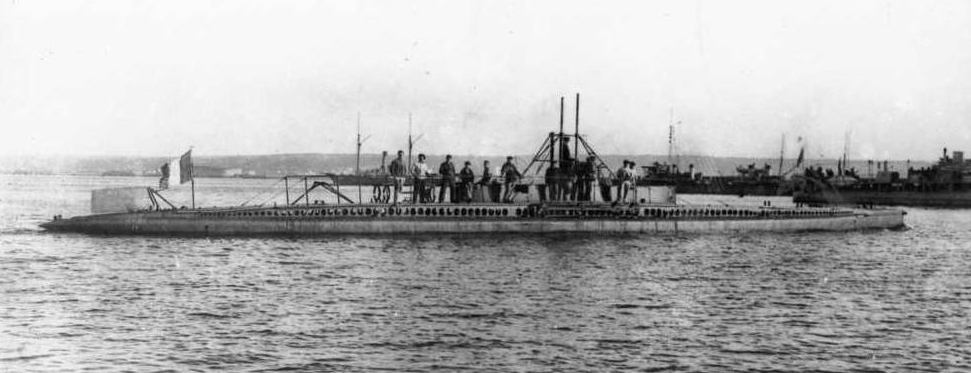
- Aigrette, date unknown

Class overview
- Name: Aigrette class
- Operators: French Navy
- Preceded by: Naïade class
- Succeeded by: Émeraude class
- Built: 1903 - 1905
- In service: 1905 - 1919
- Planned: 13
- Completed: 2
- Canceled: 11
- Retired: 2

General characteristics
- Type: Submarine
- Displacement: 178 long tons (181 t) (surfaced); 253 long tons (257 t) (submerged)
- Length: 35.9 m (117 ft 9 in)
- Beam: 4.04 m (13 ft 3 in)
- Draught: 2.63 m (8 ft 8 in)
- Propulsion: 1 × diesel engine, 150 hp (112 kW); 1 × electric motor, 130 hp (97 kW)
- Speed: 9.3 knots (17.2 km/h) (surfaced); 6.2 knots (11.5 km/h) (submerged)
- Range: 1,300 nautical miles (2,400 km) at 8 knots (15 km/h); 65 nautical miles (120 km) at 3.8 knots (7.0 km/h) (submerged)
- Complement: 14 men
- Armament: 2 × 450 mm (17.7 in) Drzewiecki drop collar torpedo launchers; 2 × 450 mm (17.7 in) torpedo cradles

The Aigrette-class submarines were a class of two submarines built for the French Navy between 1903 and 1905. They were essentially experimental submarines, and although in service during World War I, saw no action. The class was designed by Maxime Laubeuf and used Drzewiecki drop collar launchers and external cradles to launch torpedoes.

== Design ==
The submarines had a surfaced displacement of 178 long tons (181 tonnes) and a submerged displacement of 253 long tons (257 t). The dimensions were 35.9 metres (117 feet 9 inches) long, with a beam of 4.04 m (13 ft 3 in) and a draught of 2.63 m (8 ft 8 in). They had a single shaft powered by one diesel engine for surface running of 150 hp (112 kW) and an electric motor which produced 130 horsepower (97 kilowatts) for submerged propulsion. The maximum speed was 9.3 knots (17.2 kilometres per hour; 10.7 miles per hour) on the surface and 6.2 knots (11.5 km/h; 7.1 mph) while submerged with a surfaced range of 1,300 nautical miles (2,400 kilometres; 1,500 miles) at 8 knots (15 km/h) and a submerged range of 65 nautical miles (120 km) at 3.8 knots (7.0 km/h). Their complement was 14 men.

Their armament comprised two 450 mm (17.7 in) Drzewiecki drop collar torpedo launchers and two 450 mm (17.7 in) external cradles.

== Ships ==
Aigrette-class submarines
Name	Laid down	Launched	Commissioned	Fate
Aigrette	13 May 1902	23 February 1904	1905	Disarmed and sold for scrap on 14 April 1920 at Toulon
Cigogne	13 May 1902	8 November 1904	18 July 1906	Disarmed and sold for scrap on 14 April 1920 at Toulon

== See also ==
- List of submarines of France

== Citations ==
- Fontenoy, Paul E. (2007). Submarines: An Illustrated History of Their Impact. ABC-CLIO Publishing. ISBN 978-1-85109-563-6.
- Garier, Gérard (1995). L'odyssée technique et humaine du sous-marin en France [The Technical and Human Odyssey of the Submarine in France: From Plongeur (1863) to Guêpe (1904)] (in French). Vol. 1: Du Plongeur (1863) aux Guêpe (1904). Bourg-en-Bresse, France: Marines édition. ISBN 2-909675-19-X.
- Roberts, Stephen S. (2021). French Warships in the Age of Steam 1859–1914: Design, Construction, Careers and Fates. Barnsley, UK: Seaforth Publishing. ISBN 978-1-5267-4533-0.
- Smigielski, Adam (1985). "France". In Gray, Randal (ed.). Conway's All the World's Fighting Ships 1906–1921. Annapolis, Maryland: Naval Institute Press. pp. 190–220. ISBN 0-87021-907-3.
