= Farfadet-class submarine =

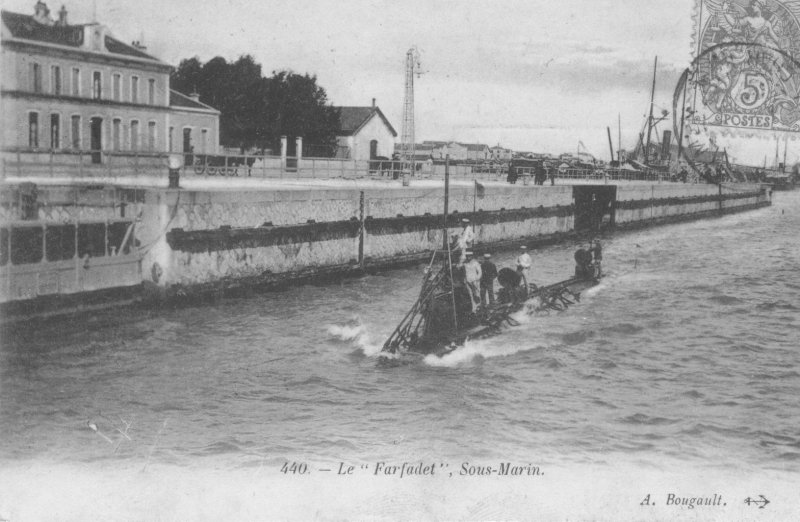
- Farfadet under way in harbour

Class overview
- Name: Farfadet class
- Operators: French Navy
- Preceded by: Sirène class
- Succeeded by: Français class
- Subclasses: Lutin
- Built: 1900–1905
- In commission: 1902–1913
- Completed: 4
- Scrapped: 4

General characteristics (Farfadet)
- Type: Submarine
- Displacement: 185 t (182 long tons) (surfaced); 202 t (199 long tons) (submerged)
- Length: 41.35 m (135 ft 8 in) (o/a)
- Beam: 2.9 m (9 ft 6 in)
- Draught: 2.7 m (8 ft 10 in)
- Installed power: 183 hp (136 kW)
- Propulsion: 1 shaft; 2 electric motors
- Speed: 8 knots (15 km/h; 9.2 mph) (surfaced); 4.3 knots (8.0 km/h; 4.9 mph) (submerged)
- Range: 75 nmi (139 km; 86 mi) at 5 knots (9.3 km/h; 5.8 mph) (surfaced); 28 nmi (52 km; 32 mi) at 4.32 knots (8.00 km/h; 4.97 mph) (submerged)
- Complement: 14
- Armament: 4 × exterior 450 mm (17.7 in) torpedo launchers

The Farfadet class consisted of four submarines built for the French Navy at the beginning of the 20th century designed by Gabriel Maugas. Two boats were lost in diving accidents. All were disposed of prior to the outbreak of the First World War.

== Design and description ==
The Farfadets were designed by Gabriel Maugas, an early French submarine engineer at the Rochefort Naval Dockyard. Derived from the Morse, the Farfadets were single-hulled, and powered by electric motors only, limiting their range and surface performance compared to the contemporary Sirène class. However they had variable-pitch propellers, developed by Maugas, obviating the need for a reversing engine.

The first three submarines, Farfadet, Gnome, and Korrigan, displaced 185 metric tons (182 long tons) surfaced and 202 metric tons (199 long tons) submerged. They had an overall length of 41.35 meters (135 ft 8 in), a beam of 2.9 meters (9 ft 6 in), and a draft of 2.7 meters (8 ft 10 in). The fourth submarine, Lutin, had an overall length of 41.45 meters (136 ft). The crew of all of the submarines numbered 2 officers and 12 enlisted men.

All of the boats were powered by a pair of Sautter-Harlé electric motors providing a total of 300 metric horsepower (296 bhp; 221 kW), both driving the single propeller shaft, except for Lutin which had two shafts. The first three boats were fitted with side-thrusting propellers (French: évoleurs) at the stern to assist in steering. They could reach a maximum speed of 6 knots (11 km/h; 6.9 mph) on the surface and 4.3 knots (8.0 km/h; 4.9 mph) underwater. The Farfadet class had a surface endurance of 430 nautical miles (800 km; 490 mi) at 7.8 knots (14.4 km/h; 9.0 mph) and a submerged endurance of 28 nmi (52 km; 32 mi) at 4.3 knots (8.0 km/h; 4.9 mph).

The boats were armed with four external 450-millimeter (17.7 in) Tissier torpedo launchers, two aimed forward and two aimed to the rear.

== Service history ==
The Farfadets were ordered as part of the French Navy's 1899 building programme, and were constructed over the next three years at the naval dockyards at Rochefort. However they were not successful in service. The loss of Farfadet on 6 July 1905, off the coast of Bizerte, Tunisia, was a national tragedy. The submarine sank suddenly after an attempt to dive failed due to a conning tower hatch being improperly shut. The officer tried to open and re-close it, but the increasing water pressure forced the hatch open completely, resulting in a rapid inundation.

14 crewmen died in the disaster. Although divers quickly located the submarine in shallow water, a salvage attempt failed when the lifting cable broke, plunging the vessel back to the bottom. Eight sailors had sealed themselves in the aft compartment and were heard tapping on the hull for 32 hours, but they ultimately succumbed to chlorine gas created by the reaction between seawater and the sulfuric acid in the batteries. The public shock was immense, and the accident drew nationwide attention to the inherent dangers of early submarine warfare.

This was not the only accident that occurred. The class suffered a second tragedy a year later when the submarine Lutin sank at Bizerte on 16 October 1906. The vessel was lost due to structural weakness in the hull under external pressure, an expensive design flaw that resulted in the loss of the entire crew of 13 men. After being salvaged, Lutin was never recommissioned for service but was instead used for trials and as a target ship before being scrapped.

The other two vessels were taken out of service in 1906 and sold for scrap in 1910–1911.

== Ships ==
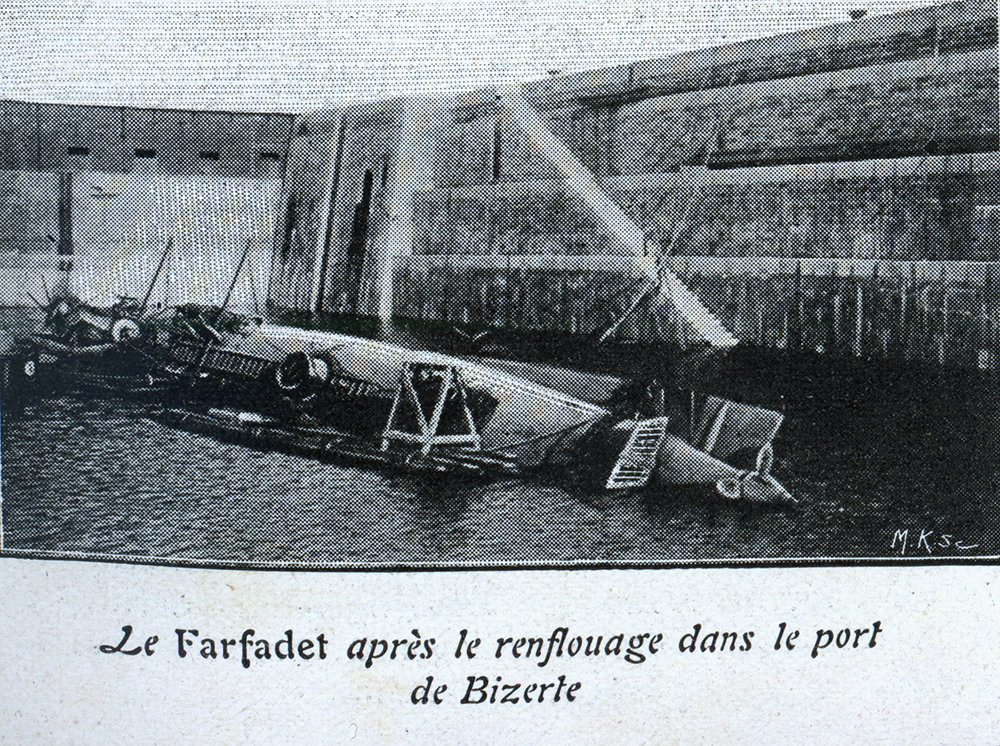
Farfadet raised 1905

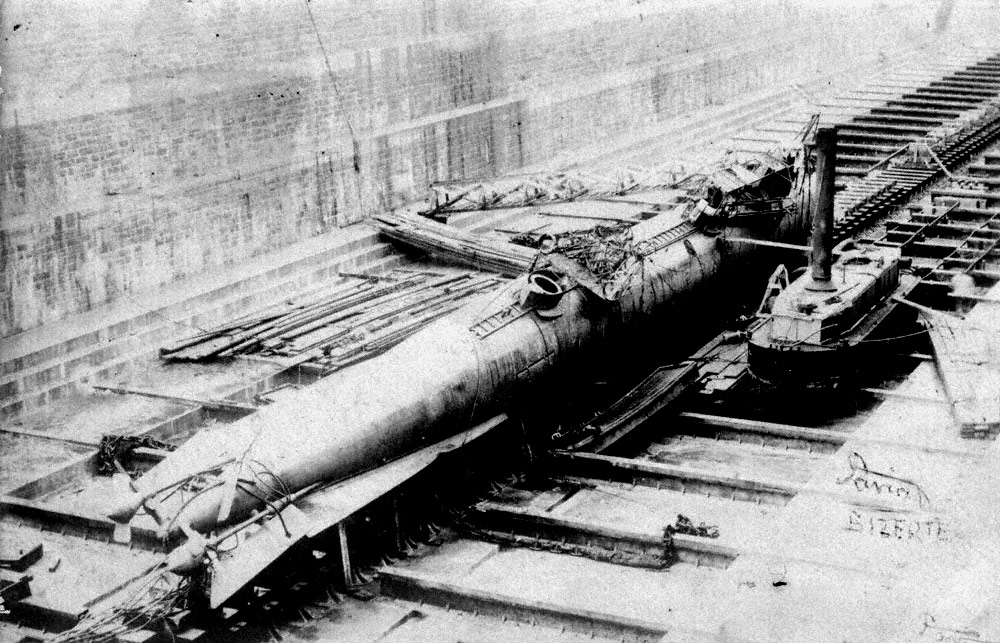
Lutin raised 1906

Construction data
| Ship | Builder | Laid down | Launched | Commissioned | Fate |
|---|---|---|---|---|---|
| Farfadet | Arsenal de Rochefort | 2 April 1900 | 17 May 1901 | 29 August 1902 | Lost in diving accident, 6 July 1905. Raised, re-commissioned as Follet, stricken, 22 Nov 1913, and sold for scrap. |
| Korrigan | Arsenal de Rochefort | 23 April 1900 | 25 January 1902 | 29 August 1902 | Sold for scrap, 10 August 1911 |
| Gnome | Arsenal de Rochefort | c. 1901 | 23 July 1902 | 2 June 1905 | Sold for scrap, 24 March 1912 |
| Lutin | Arsenal de Rochefort | 27 February 1902 | 12 February 1903 | 1904 | Sold for scrap, 2 August 1911 |
