= Gabriel Maugas =

French naval engineer (1866–1931)

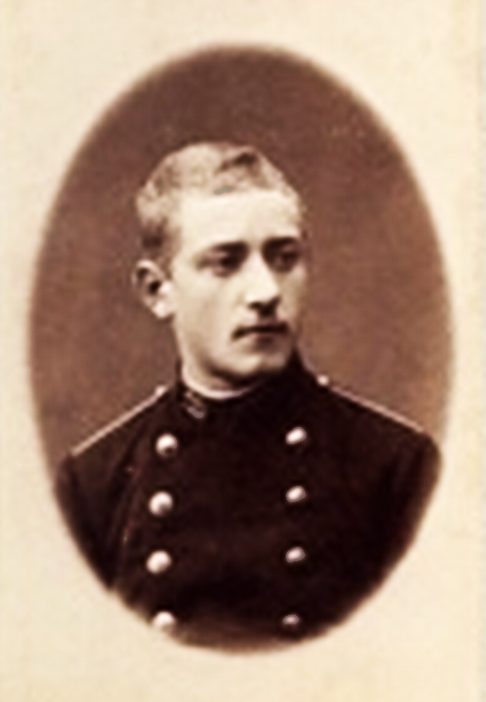
- Maugas in 1886
- Born: December 1866; Fromental, France
- Died: 1931
- Occupation: Naval engineer

Gabriel Maugas (December 1866 – October 1931) was a French naval engineer and designer of submarines at the beginning of the 20th century, designing several submarine classes for the French Navy in that period. He also held various managerial posts in French industry.

== Early life ==
Maugas was born in Fromental, Haute Vienne, in December 1866. After studying at the École Polytechnique he qualified as a marine engineer, working at the Rochefort Naval Dockyard.

== Career ==
Maugas was involved in submarine design in the late 19th century and early 20th century, producing the Farfadet class in 1899 and the Émeraude class in 1903. He also produced an experimental design, the submarine Z (Q36). Maugas's designs favoured a single-hull construction, though he adopted dual propulsion, as opposed to earlier single-engine designs, integrating diesel engines for surface propulsion with electric motors when submerged. He also perfected a reversible screw, obviating the need for a ship to carry a reversing engine.

In 1911, he was appointed chief engineer at the Toulon Arsenal, and served during the First World War as an advisor to Marshal Foch.

After the war Maugas was director of the HADIR (Hauts-Fourneaux et Aciéries de Differdange-St Ingebert-Rumelange) steel works in Differdange, Luxembourg. The rue Gabriel Maugas in Differdange is named after him.

Maugas died in October 1931, aged 64.

== Recognition ==
Gabriel Maugas was made Knight ("Chevalier") of the Legion of Honour in July 1902. He became an Officer of the Legion of Honour in July 1912, and was made Commander in April 1921.

He has a street named after him in Differdange.
