= French submarine Morse (Q3) =

- Morse, c. 1909

History

France
- Name: Morse
- Namesake: Walrus
- Ordered: 19 June 1897
- Builder: Arsenal de Cherbourg
- Laid down: 22 February 1898
- Launched: 4 July 1899
- Commissioned: 3 March 1900
- Stricken: 9 March 1910
- Fate: Sold for scrap, 8 July 1911

General characteristics (as built)
- Type: Submarine
- Displacement: 143 t (141 long tons) (surfaced); 143 t (141 long tons) (submerged)
- Length: 36.5 m (119 ft 9 in) (o/a)
- Beam: 2.75 m (9 ft)
- Draft: 2.87 m (9 ft 5 in) (mean)
- Installed power: 300 PS (300 bhp; 220 kW)
- Propulsion: 1 × shaft; 2 × electric motors
- Speed: 7.25 knots (13.43 km/h; 8.34 mph) (surfaced); 5.5 knots (10.2 km/h; 6.3 mph) (submerged)
- Range: 90 nmi (170 km; 100 mi) at 4.3 knots (8.0 km/h; 4.9 mph) (surfaced)
- Test depth: 30m
- Complement: 10
- Armament: 1 x 450 mm (17.7 in) torpedo tube; 3 × torpedoes

The French submarine Morse (“Walrus”) was an early submersible built for the French Navy at the end of the 19th century. She was designed by French naval engineer Gaston Romazotti and remained in service until 1909, when she was superseded by more advanced designs.

== Construction ==
Morse was designed by French naval engineer Gaston Romazotti, who was chief engineer at the Arsenal de Cherbourg and an early submarine pioneer, having worked with Gustave Zédé on both Gymnote and Sirene (later renamed for Zédé after his death). Morse was designed to combine the best features of both vessels. Morse was laid down at Cherbourg in June 1897 and launched two years later in July 1899. She was of single-hulled construction, and built of Roma-bronze, a copper alloy of Romazotti's devising, which was intended to be more flexible than an all-steel hull, and which would interfere less with the vessel's magnetic compass. Morse was powered by a 284cv electric motor, which gave her a range of 90 nautical miles on the surface at an average speed of 4.3 knots.

== Plan ==
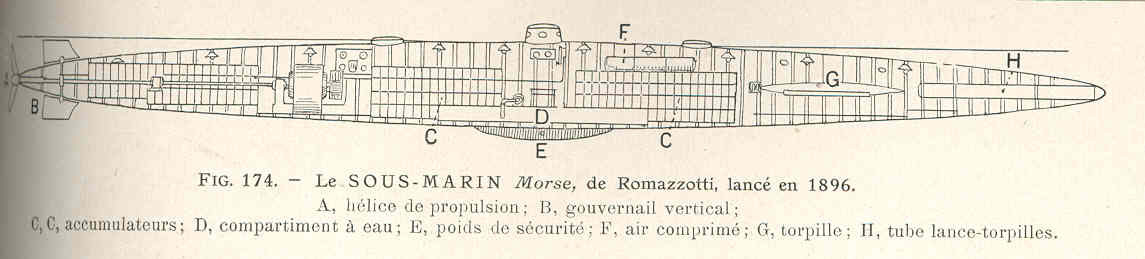
Plan of French submarine Morse, designed by Gaston Romazotti

Key
a. screw propeller
b. vertical rudder
c. accumulators
d. ballast tank
e. trim weights
f. compressed air
g. torpedo
h. torpedo tube

== Service history ==
Morse was commissioned in March 1900. She was based at Cherbourg and remained in service for nine years. In March 1909 Morse was involved in a collision with the British schooner Greenwich, receiving damage to her rudder and propeller.

In November the same year Morse was stricken from service.
