= Cherbourg =

Former municipality in Manche, France

Cherbourg Chèrbourg / Tchidbouo (Norman)
- Part of Cherbourg-en-Cotentin
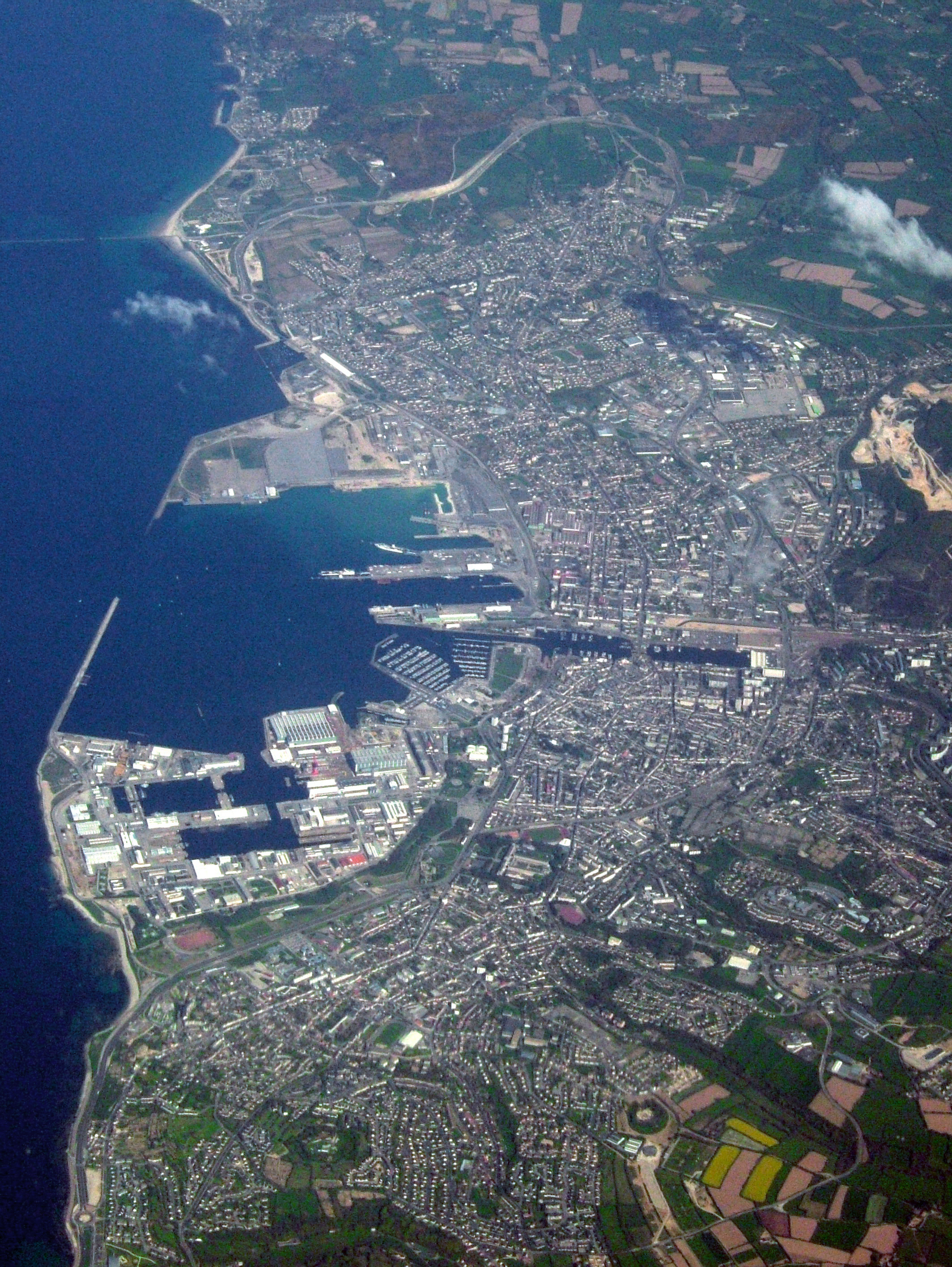
- May 2006 aerial view of Cherbourg
- Location of Cherbourg
- Location within France Location within Normandy
- Coordinates: 49°38′N 1°37′W
- Country: France
- Region: Normandy
- Department: Manche
- Arrondissement: Cherbourg
- Commune: Cherbourg-en-Cotentin
- Area^{1}: 6.91 km^{2} (2.67 sq mi)
- Highest elevation: 139 m (456 ft)
- Population (1999): 25,370
  - Density: 3,670/km^{2} (9,510/sq mi)
- Time zone: UTC+01:00 (CET)
  - Summer (DST): UTC+02:00 (CEST)
- Postal code: 50100
- ^{1} French Land Register data, which excludes lakes, ponds, glaciers > 1 km^{2} (0.386 sq mi or 247 acres) and river estuaries.

Cherbourg (Note: /ˈʃɛərbɜːrɡ, ˈʃɛərbʊərɡ/ SHAIR-burg, SHAIR-boorg, also UK: /ˈʃɜːrbʊərɡ/ SHUR-boorg, US: /ˈʃɛərbʊər, ʃɛərˈbʊər/ SHAIR-boor, shair-BOOR, French: [ʃɛʁbuʁ]; Norman: Chèrbourg or Tchidbouo.) is a former commune and subprefecture located at the northern end of the Cotentin Peninsula in the northwestern French department of Manche. It was merged into the commune of Cherbourg-Octeville on 28 February 2000, which was merged into the new commune of Cherbourg-en-Cotentin on 1 January 2016.

Cherbourg is protected by Cherbourg Harbour, between La Hague and Val de Saire, and the city has been a strategic position over the centuries, disputed between the English and French. Cited as one of the "keys to the kingdom" by Vauban, it became, by colossal maritime development work, a first-rate military port under the leadership of Napoleon I, and holds an arsenal of the French Navy. A stopping point for prestigious transatlantic liners in the first half of the 20th century, Cherbourg was the primary goal of US troops during the invasion of Normandy in 1944.

Along with its use as a military, fishing and yachting port, it is also a cross-Channel ferry port, with routes to the English ports of Poole and Portsmouth, and to Dublin and Rosslare Harbour in Ireland. Limited by its geographical isolation from being a great commercial port, it is nonetheless an important shipbuilding centre, and a working-class city with a rural hinterland.

== Geography ==
=== Location ===
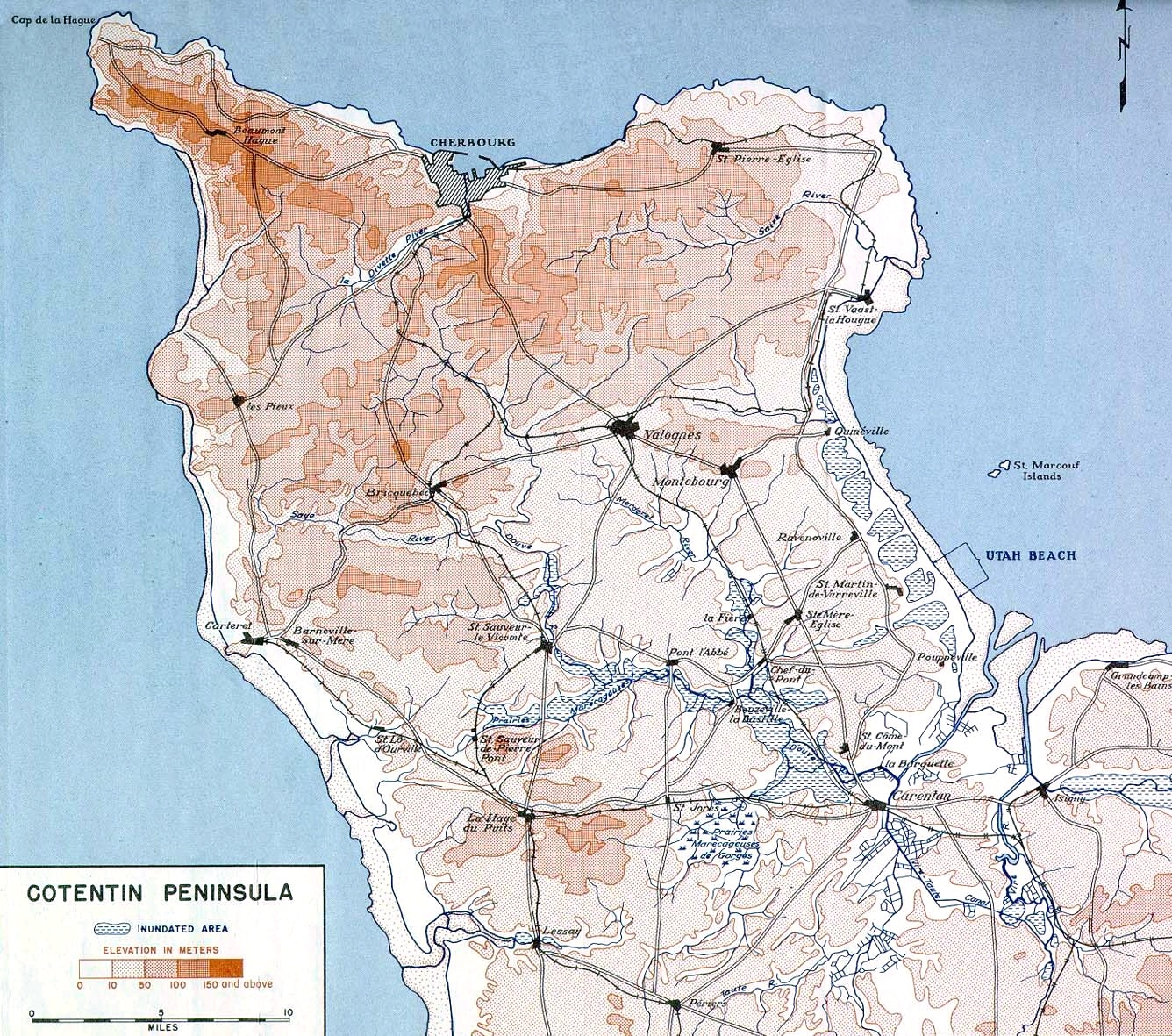
A map of the Cotentin peninsula, with Cherbourg to the north

Cherbourg is located at the northern tip of the Cotentin Peninsula, in the department of Manche, of which it is a subprefecture. At the time of the 1999 census the city of Cherbourg had an area of 6.91 square kilometres (2.668 sq mi), while the city of Octeville had an area of 7.35 km^{2} (2.838 sq mi). The largest city in the Department of Manche, it is the result of the merger of the communes of Cherbourg and Octeville. The amalgamated city today has an area of 14.26 km^{2} (5.506 sq mi). Cherbourg is situated at the mouth of the Divette and at the south of the bay between Cap Lévi to the east and Cap de La Hague to the west, Cherbourg-Octeville is 120 km (75 mi) from the English coast.

Cherbourg and Octeville-sur-Cherbourg once belonged to the deanery of La Hague, delimited by the Divette. In 1786, a part of Equeurdreville joined Cherbourg, during the construction of the port, and then in 1802, a portion of Octeville. Since 1811, the "mielles" [dunes] of Tourlaville, commune of the deanery of Saire, are integrated into the Cherbourg territory known as the quarter of Val-de-Saire where the Pasteur Hospital and the Saint-Clement Church were built. Thus, Cherbourg-Octeville lies both in La Hague and in the Val de Saire.

Like all Chantereyne and the area of the Mielles, the Cherbourg territory was reclaimed from the sea. Built at the level of the sea, the town developed at the foot of the Roule mountain (highest point of the old town) and la Fauconnière. Octeville is a former rural municipality, composed of hamlets, whose settlement extended from the 19th century and whose territory is highly urbanised since 1950, especially around the ZUP of the provinces and the university campus.

The bordering communes are Tourlaville to the east, Équeurdreville-Hainneville to the west, La Glacerie to the south and southeast, Martinvast to the south, and Nouainville and Sideville to the south-west.

=== Geology ===
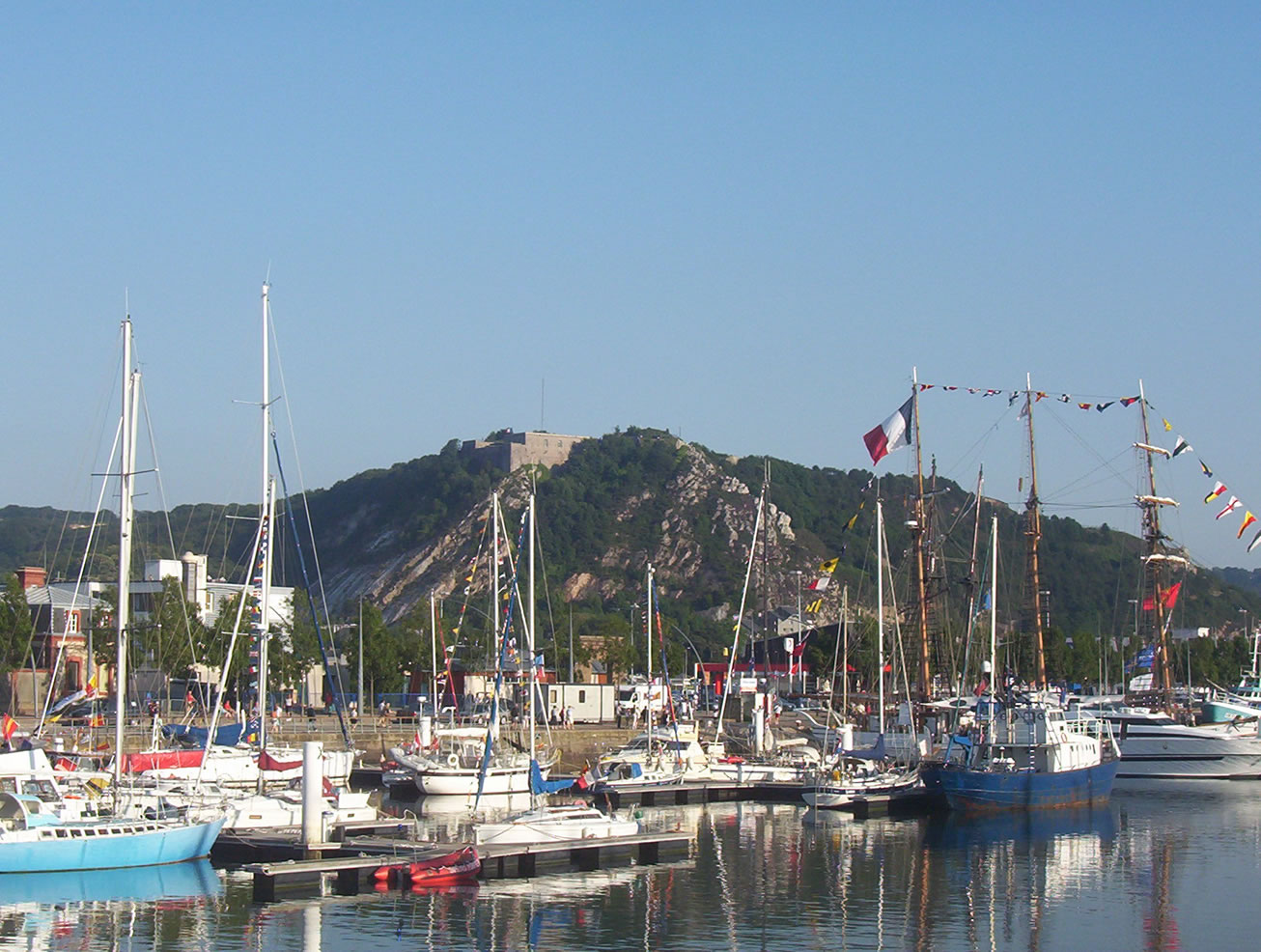
The Montagne du Roule seen from the commercial harbour.

Located at the end of the Armorican Massif, Cherbourg retains traces of the geologic formation, deformed granites and metamorphic schists of the Precambrian of Hercynian orogeny by the folding of the arkoses of the Cambrian and Armorican sandstone and shale of the Ordovician. These folds result in layers of sandstone tilted 45° towards the north-east on la Fauconniere (including "La Roche qui pend" ['the hanging rock']) and the Montagne du Roule. These two cliffs are due to sea erosion in the Quaternary. The retreat of the sea then gave way to sand dunes and tidal marshes, destroyed by the urbanisation of the 17th and 19th centuries, identical to those of Collignon in Tourlaville.

These rocks in the soil have been used for centuries in several ways: Crushed granite extracted in Querqueville and arkoses of Becquet, have been used for the manufacture of rubble (moellon) and blocks squared for lintels. The greenschist, whose colour comes from chlorite and sericite, are used mainly for roofing in Nord-Cotentin, but also masonry in Cherbourg. The Armorican sandstone of the Montagne du Roule is used for rubble and rockfill. Most of the many quarries, which opened in the metropolitan area for building the harbour wall, are now closed.

=== Hydrography ===
Cherbourg is bordered by the sea. The construction of the port of trade, from 1769, accompanied by the diversion of the Divette (the mouth of which was located at the current exit of Port Chantereyne) and the Trottebec (from the territory of Tourlaville) gathered in the canal de retenue, along the Avenue de Paris and Rue du Val-de-Saire.

The streams of the Bucaille and the Fay, which watered the Croûte du Homet, disappeared in the 18th century during the construction of the military port.

=== Climate ===
Cherbourg has a temperate oceanic climate. Its maritime character causes high humidity (84%) and a strong sea wind, commonly stormy but also low seasonal variations of temperature and few days of frost (7.3). The combined effect of the wind and the tides can generate a rapid change of weather in a single day, with sun and rain which can be a few hours apart.

The influence of the Gulf Stream and the mildness of the winter allow the naturalisation of many Mediterranean and exotic plants (mimosas, palms, agaves, etc.) which are present in the public and private gardens of the city, despite average insolation. The climate is similar to areas much further north in Great Britain and Ireland due to the moderation. Summers are far cooler than expected by French standards.

Climate data for Cherbourg-Homet, elevation 19 m (62 ft), (1991–2014 normals, extremes 1968–2014)
Month	Jan	Feb	Mar	Apr	May	Jun	Jul	Aug	Sep	Oct	Nov	Dec	Year
Record high °C (°F)	16.5 (61.7)	19.8 (67.6)	22.6 (72.7)	25.2 (77.4)	29.5 (85.1)	32.2 (90.0)	31.0 (87.8)	34.2 (93.6)	31.4 (88.5)	30.0 (86.0)	19.4 (66.9)	16.0 (60.8)	34.2 (93.6)
Mean daily maximum °C (°F)	9.4 (48.9)	9.4 (48.9)	11.1 (52.0)	12.9 (55.2)	15.4 (59.7)	18.4 (65.1)	20.2 (68.4)	20.7 (69.3)	19.0 (66.2)	16.2 (61.2)	12.6 (54.7)	10.0 (50.0)	14.6 (58.3)
Daily mean °C (°F)	7.4 (45.3)	7.3 (45.1)	8.7 (47.7)	10.2 (50.4)	12.7 (54.9)	15.4 (59.7)	17.3 (63.1)	17.9 (64.2)	16.4 (61.5)	13.8 (56.8)	10.5 (50.9)	8.0 (46.4)	12.1 (53.8)
Mean daily minimum °C (°F)	5.4 (41.7)	5.1 (41.2)	6.3 (43.3)	7.5 (45.5)	9.9 (49.8)	12.4 (54.3)	14.5 (58.1)	15.1 (59.2)	13.8 (56.8)	11.5 (52.7)	8.5 (47.3)	6.0 (42.8)	9.7 (49.5)
Record low °C (°F)	−8.6 (16.5)	−8.0 (17.6)	−1.0 (30.2)	0.6 (33.1)	0.6 (33.1)	5.8 (42.4)	9.0 (48.2)	9.2 (48.6)	6.4 (43.5)	1.5 (34.7)	−3.5 (25.7)	−4.8 (23.4)	−8.6 (16.5)
Average precipitation mm (inches)	105.4 (4.15)	80.5 (3.17)	65.8 (2.59)	63.2 (2.49)	54.8 (2.16)	51.8 (2.04)	48.4 (1.91)	51.7 (2.04)	66.6 (2.62)	115.1 (4.53)	121.6 (4.79)	139.0 (5.47)	963.9 (37.96)
Average precipitation days (≥ 1.0 mm)	14.5	11.6	9.7	10.1	8.3	8.2	8.3	8.3	9.4	14.5	15.9	16.2	134.8
Source: Meteociel

Climate data for Cherbourg (Gonneville), elevation 134 m (440 ft), (1991–2020 normals, extremes 1959–present)
Month	Jan	Feb	Mar	Apr	May	Jun	Jul	Aug	Sep	Oct	Nov	Dec	Year
Record high °C (°F)	14.9 (58.8)	18.9 (66.0)	23.7 (74.7)	23.9 (75.0)	28.6 (83.5)	31.7 (89.1)	33.7 (92.7)	33.4 (92.1)	29.4 (84.9)	27.0 (80.6)	20.8 (69.4)	15.9 (60.6)	33.7 (92.7)
Mean daily maximum °C (°F)	8.2 (46.8)	8.4 (47.1)	10.2 (50.4)	12.5 (54.5)	15.2 (59.4)	18.1 (64.6)	20.0 (68.0)	20.2 (68.4)	18.2 (64.8)	15.1 (59.2)	11.4 (52.5)	9.0 (48.2)	13.9 (57.0)
Daily mean °C (°F)	6.0 (42.8)	6.0 (42.8)	7.5 (45.5)	9.3 (48.7)	12.0 (53.6)	14.6 (58.3)	16.5 (61.7)	16.8 (62.2)	15.1 (59.2)	12.3 (54.1)	9.0 (48.2)	6.8 (44.2)	11.0 (51.8)
Mean daily minimum °C (°F)	3.9 (39.0)	3.6 (38.5)	4.8 (40.6)	6.1 (43.0)	8.7 (47.7)	11.2 (52.2)	13.1 (55.6)	13.4 (56.1)	12.0 (53.6)	9.6 (49.3)	6.7 (44.1)	4.6 (40.3)	8.1 (46.6)
Record low °C (°F)	−12.3 (9.9)	−9.9 (14.2)	−4.6 (23.7)	−3.1 (26.4)	0.1 (32.2)	2.9 (37.2)	6.0 (42.8)	6.3 (43.3)	3.5 (38.3)	−0.6 (30.9)	−4.0 (24.8)	−8.8 (16.2)	−12.3 (9.9)
Average precipitation mm (inches)	101.7 (4.00)	75.1 (2.96)	64.8 (2.55)	60.4 (2.38)	56.7 (2.23)	51.8 (2.04)	48.5 (1.91)	62.0 (2.44)	69.1 (2.72)	111.5 (4.39)	113.5 (4.47)	125.3 (4.93)	940.4 (37.02)
Average precipitation days (≥ 1.0 mm)	14.7	12.0	10.9	9.8	9.4	8.4	8.2	9.1	10.0	15.2	16.2	16.3	140.2
Source: Meteociel

Comparison of weather conditions
City	Sunshine (hrs/yr)	Rain (mm/yr)	Snow (days/yr)	Storm (days/yr)	Fog (days/yr)
Cherbourg-Octeville	1538	692.3	5.1	5.3	26.6
National Average	1973	770	14	22	40
Paris	1661	637	12	18	10
Nice	2724	733	1	29	1
Strasbourg	1693	665	29	29	53
Brest	1605	1211	7	12	75

=== Routes of communication and transport ===
==== Road ====
Historically, Cherbourg is at the western end of Route nationale 13, which runs through the city by the "Rouges Terres" and the Avenue de Paris, from La Glacerie. In the 1990s, a deviation from the road, now European routes E03 and E46, referred traffic through La Glacerie and Tourlaville on a three-way axis from La Glacerie, to the Penesme roundabout at Tourlaville and then a dual carriageway to a roundabout located between Collignon Beach and the Port des Flamands. An extension to Cherbourg is in the works, with the doubling of the bridge over the Port des Flamands, to ensure a continuity of the dual carriageway to the commercial port in Cherbourg.

The old Route nationale 801 (reclassified as D901), which connects Cap de la Hague to Barfleur, crosses the city from east to west.

After the completion of the bypass east of the agglomeration, a western bypass project is under study, and a 'zone' corresponding to the future final route has been selected. Similarly, upgrading to a dual carriageway for access of Maupertus Airport is envisaged.

The D650 is used to connect Cherbourg to the west coast of the Cotentin peninsula. Departing from Cherbourg, the D650 takes a southwesterly direction to Les Pieux and then along to join the Côte des Isles (the Channel Islands coast) to Barneville-Carteret. In the approach to Cherbourg, this road has undergone development, in recent years, with amenities (roundabouts, traffic lights, urban development) by virtue of the peri-urbanisation of the communes in its path.

With the awarding of autoroute status to the RN13 in 2006, the work of upgrading to motorway standard between Cherbourg and Caen is being undertaken over a 10-year period. The construction work of the RN13 at the entrance of the Cherbourg agglomeration (locality Virage des Chèvres) was completed in early 2009.

==== Sea ====
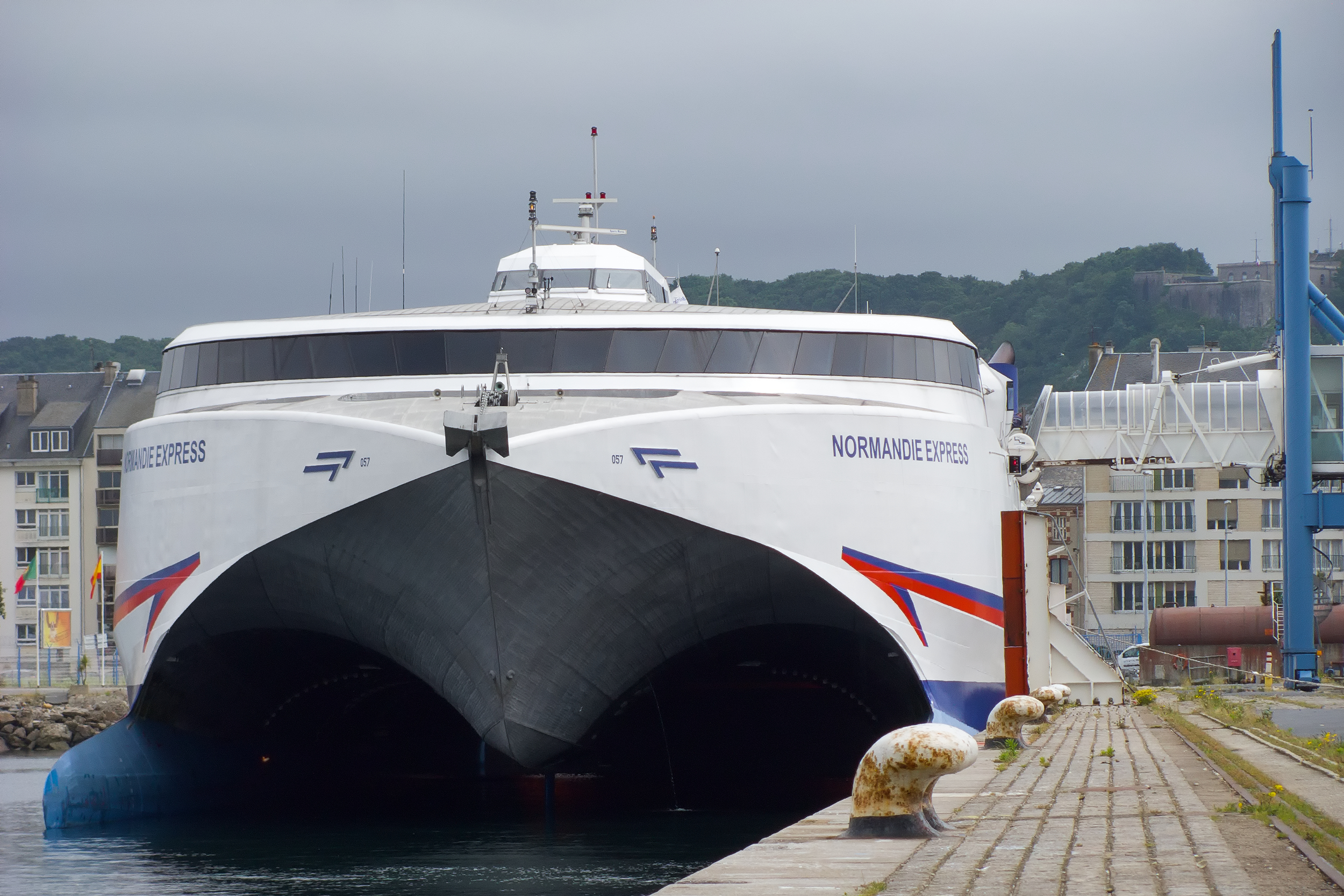
The Normandie Express catamaran ferry at Cherbourg

Cherbourg-Octeville is a port on the English Channel with a number of regular passenger and freight ferry services operating from the large modern ferry terminal and has a major artificial harbour. The following operators currently run services from the port:

- Brittany Ferries to Rosslare, Poole (1 sailing daily) and Portsmouth (up to 2 sailings daily, summer only).
- Stena Line to Rosslare (3 sailings weekly).
- Irish Ferries to Dublin (2 sailings weekly).

Cherbourg has previously had services operated by the following operators:

- Stena Line to Southampton (up to 2 sailings daily). Withdrawn in 1996.
- P&O Ferries to Portsmouth (up to 2 sailings daily by conventional ferry and up to 3 by fast ferry during the summer). Withdrawn in 2005 following a business review.
- P&O Irish Sea to Rosslare (up to 3 sailings weekly) and Dublin (weekends only during the summer). Dublin service was withdrawn in 2004 and Rosslare service sold to Celtic Link.
- HD Ferries to Guernsey and Jersey. Operated in 2007 but cancelled in 2008 due to lack of customers.
- Celtic Link Ferries to Rosslare (3 sailings weekly). Service sold to Stena Line.
- Condor Ferries to Portsmouth (1 sailing weekly in summer only).

The port welcomes some 30 cruise ships per year including the largest, thanks to a cruise terminal built in 2006 in the Gare Maritime de Cherbourg, which had opened in 1933 on the Quai de France next to the Cité de la Mer. Frequently, cruise ships that have planned for another destination have taken refuge in the port, for protection from the frequent storms.

Conventional cargo ships berth in the eastern area of the docks on the Quai des Flamands and Quai des Mielles. During the construction of the Concorde prototypes in the 1960s, some sections built in the United Kingdom passed by ferry through Cherbourg, for transfer to Toulouse.

==== Rail ====
The Paris - Cherbourg railway line, operated by Réseau Ferré de France, ends at Cherbourg railway station, which opened in 1858 and welcomes a million passengers every year. This line continued, at the beginning of the 20th century, up to the resort of Urville-Nacqueville and was complemented by the Tue-Vâques which served from Cherbourg to Val de Saire between 1911 and 1950. Today, the Intercités Paris-Caen-Cherbourg line is the most profitable in its class with profit over €10 million per year despite numerous incidents and delays.

Regular services operate to Paris-Saint-Lazare via Caen using Intercités stock, local TER services operate from the station to Lisieux via Caen and to Rennes via Saint-Lô. Intercités services to Paris-Saint-Lazare take three hours on average.

From July 2009 to December 2010, a TGV Cherbourg – Dijon service operated, via Mantes and Roissy TGV. With one daily round-trip, it operated experimentally for three years and gave the people of Cherbourg direct access by rail to France's primary airport. The service ceased prematurely, as the minimum threshold of passenger traffic was not met.

As well as a main line station there was also the Gare Maritime Transatlantique station. This now forms part of the Cité de la mer.

==== Bus ====
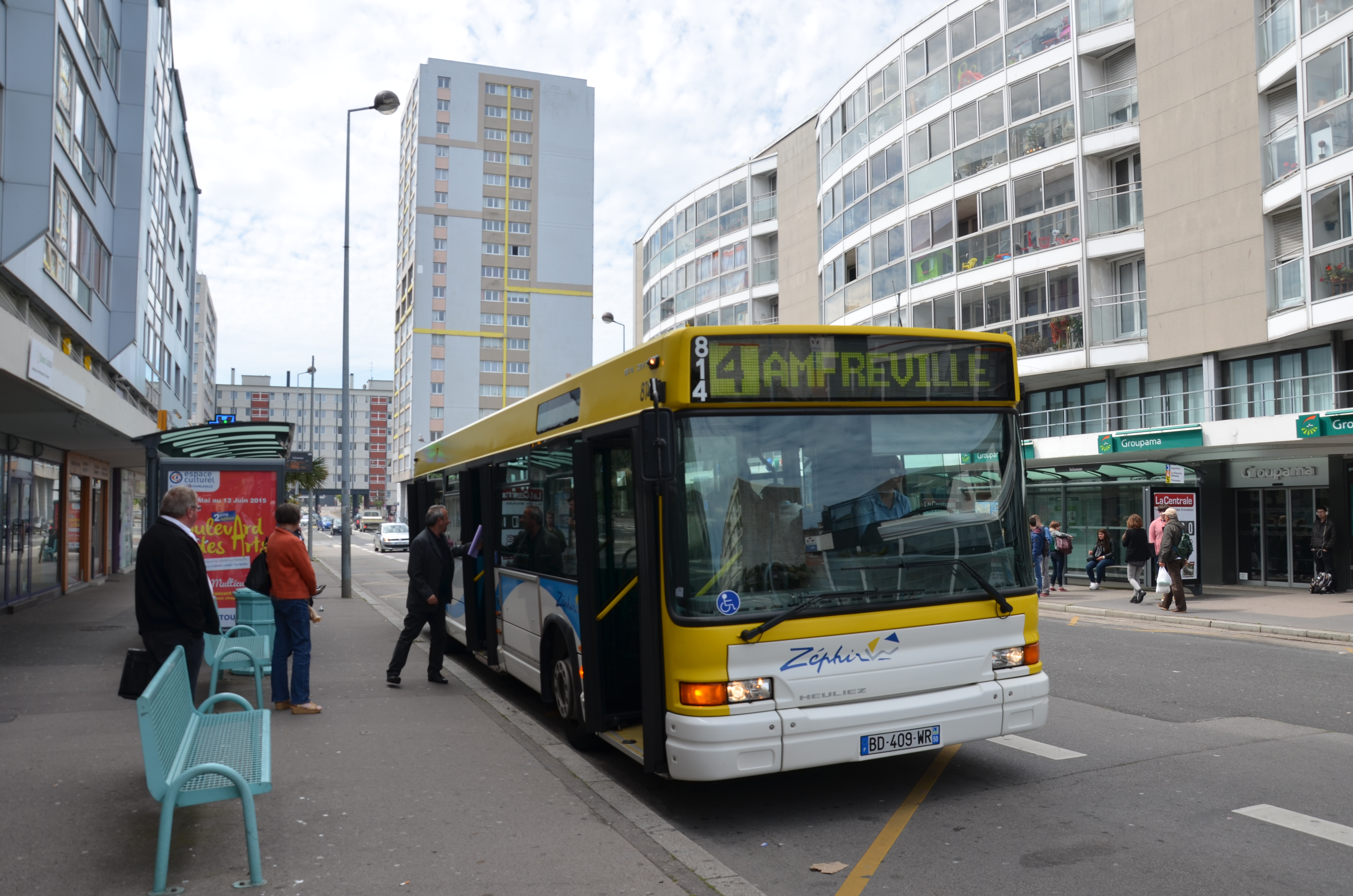
A bus of the Zéphir Bus network of Cherbourg.

The Compagnie des transports de Cherbourg (CTC) was created in 1896, connecting the Place de Tourlaville and the Place du Château by a tramway in Cherbourg, then to Urville. After the German occupation and bombardment of the tram depot, the use of buses took over, and it was not until 1962 that the network had several lines. From 1976, the Communauté urbaine de Cherbourg supported the jurisdiction of public transit. Management of the public service is delegated to Keolis, the CTC took the name of Zephir Bus in 1991.

The network covers the whole of the metropolitan area. In recent years, a night bus service has also been created.

Cherbourg-Octeville and its suburbs are also served by the Manéo departmental bus service.

==== Air ====
The Cherbourg – Maupertus Airport, located in Maupertus-sur-Mer, serves the city. Its 2,440 m (8,010 ft) runway hosts charter flights. After stopping the daily service to Paris by Twin Jet, in spring 2008, a new link with Caen and Paris started with Chalair on 27 October 2008.

With 40,500 passengers in 2007, the airport had lost 30% of its commercial passengers, and 10% of its total traffic over a year.

== History ==
=== Heraldry ===
Arms of Cherbourg-Octeville	The arms of Cherbourg-Octeville are blazoned: Azure, on a fess argent, charged of three mullets of six points sable, accompanied of three bezants (Or), two in chief, one in point. From the Empire, the coat of arms was accompanied by external ornaments: Mural crown with five rounds of argent, crest crossed fess a caduceus bypassed same on which are suspended two scallops used as mantling, one dexter olive, the other sinister oak, argent knotted and fastened by strips of azure. They also contain a Croix de guerre 1939-1945 with natural palm, appended at the point of the shield and surmounting the croisure strips.

The origin of the coat of arms is disputed.

According to Victor Le Sens, it is of religious origin: Fess argent charged of stars represents the belt of the Virgin Mary, one of the two patrons of the city and the number of stars, like the bezants, evokes the Trinity, the other patron of the city. The bezants would be the expression of the redemption of the captives, illustrating the participation of the notables of Cherbourg on the Third Crusade. The coat of arms of Cherbourg dates from the late 12th century, at the time of the Crusades.

According to M. Le Poupet, which relies in particular on the works of Vulson de la Colombière and Ségoing, the content of the coat of arms evokes the maritime trade of the city, the bezants - traditional furniture of the arms of ennobled financiers - represent wealth and fortune, while the star shows peace and prudence. The sable signifies prudence and constancy in adversity, the azure denotes activity and the seas. M. Canel had explained before him that the bezants and stars respectively illustrated trade and sea port.

The stars, absent from the armorial of d'Hozier in 1697, were added in the 18th century. Under the Empire, the coat of arms was completed by a free area of second-class towns which is to dexter azure to an "N" of or, surmounted by a pointed star of the same, brocading at the ninth of the escutcheon.

Regarding the external ornaments, the mural crown symbolises protection and happiness, the caduceus of trade and business, the olive tree of peace, the oak of strength, recalling the role of both the military and commercial port. The argent means that Cherbourg was a second class city under the Empire.

Arms of Octeville	The arms of Cherbourg-Octeville are blazoned: Vert to the mantle of argent charged with two capital letters of sable "O" dexter, "V" sinister, of the chief of gules to a leopard or armed and lampasséd azure. It was the logo of the municipality until the merger with Cherbourg, which then took the logo of Cherbourg.

Today, the municipality of Cherbourg-Octeville uses a logo, entitled "mouette musicale" [musical seagull]. Initially adopted by Cherbourg, it consists of a gull, symbolising the maritime character of the town, on a musical stave, evoking the musicality of the port: "The cry of the seagulls that dance between sky and sea, the mermaids of ships and the melodious song of the waves".

=== Origins and toponymy ===
The date of Foundation of Cherbourg can not be set precisely, although several local historians, including Robert Lerouvillois, trace the origin of the city to Coriallo (for *Coriovallo) of the Unelli. According to Pierre-Yves Lambert, the Celtic element corio- means "army, troop" and the element vallo- similar to the Latin vallum, would be "rampart, fortification".

Mentioned on the Tabula Peutingeriana (c. 365), in the Antonine Itinerary and the Gesta de Fontenelle ("In pago Coriovallinse", 747-753), Coriallo, Latinised then as Coriallum, hosted a Roman garrison during the late Roman Empire, and the recovered remains would be the village between Cherbourg and Tourlaville, on the Mielles.

The Cotentin Peninsula was the first territory conquered by the Vikings in their ninth century invasion. They developed Cherbourg as a port. After the Anglo-Scandinavian settlement, a new name appeared there in a still Latinised form: Carusburg Castellum (1026-1027, Fauroux 58) then Carisburg (1056–1066, Fauroux 214), Chiersburg (William of Jumièges, v. 1070), Chieresburg (Wace, Roman de Rou, v. 1175). Carusburg would mean "fortress of the marsh" in Old Norse kjarr (marsh), and borg (castle, fortified town) or "city of the marais" in Old English ker (bog) and burgh (town). The element kjarr / ker is also found in Normandy in Villequier and Orcher. According to François de Beaurepaire, it comes rather from the Old English chiriche (spelled ċiriċe, Church) or [tch] is reduced to [s], as the commune of Chirbury, in the County of Shropshire, formerly also spelled Chirichburig (915) and Chiresbir (1226).

The name of Octeville appears meanwhile, in 1063, in a Charter of William the Conqueror about allocations made to the Collegiate Church of Cherbourg. It means: "the rural area of Otti", a Scandinavian male name also found in Octeville-l'Avenel, Octeville-sur-Mer and Otby (Lincolnshire, Ottebi, 11th century).

Cherbourg is also the name of a Canadian township, located between Matane and Les Méchins, which gave its name to the communes of Saint-Thomas-de-Cherbourg, merged in 1954 into Les Méchins, and Saint-Jean-de-Cherbourg. This name, including the proclamation date of 7 May 1864, could be due to the impact by the local newspapers of the inauguration of the military port by Napoleon III in 1858. Cherbourg is also the name of a town in Queensland, Australia.

=== Middle Ages ===
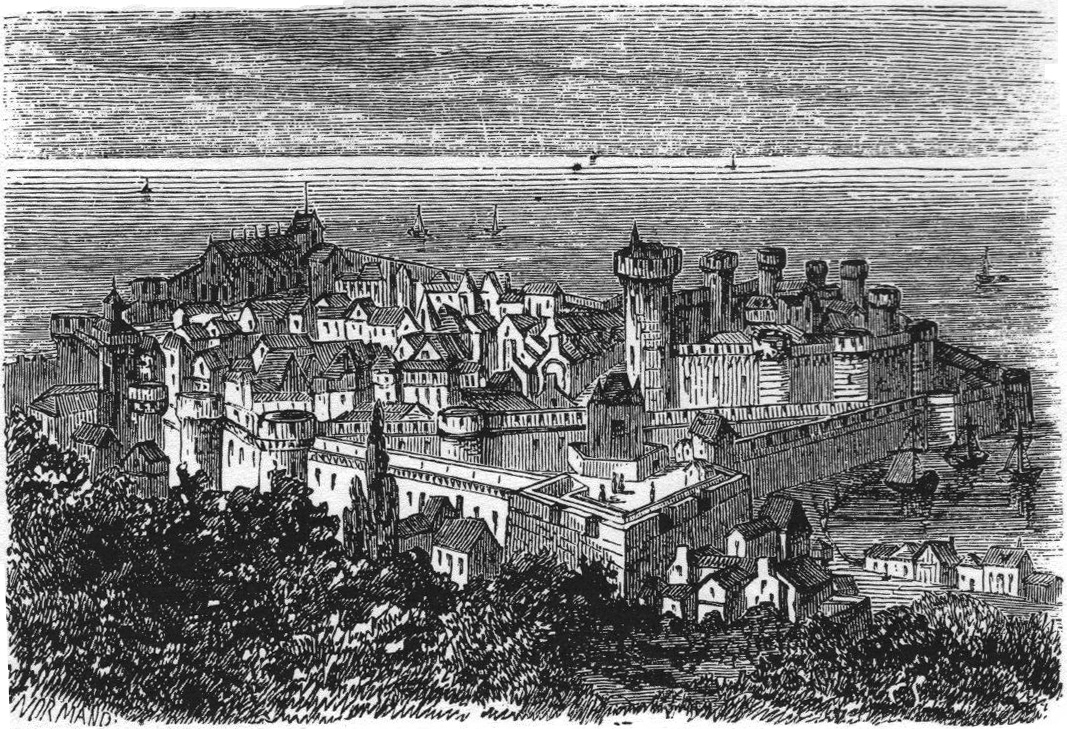
A view of Cherbourg in the 17th century.

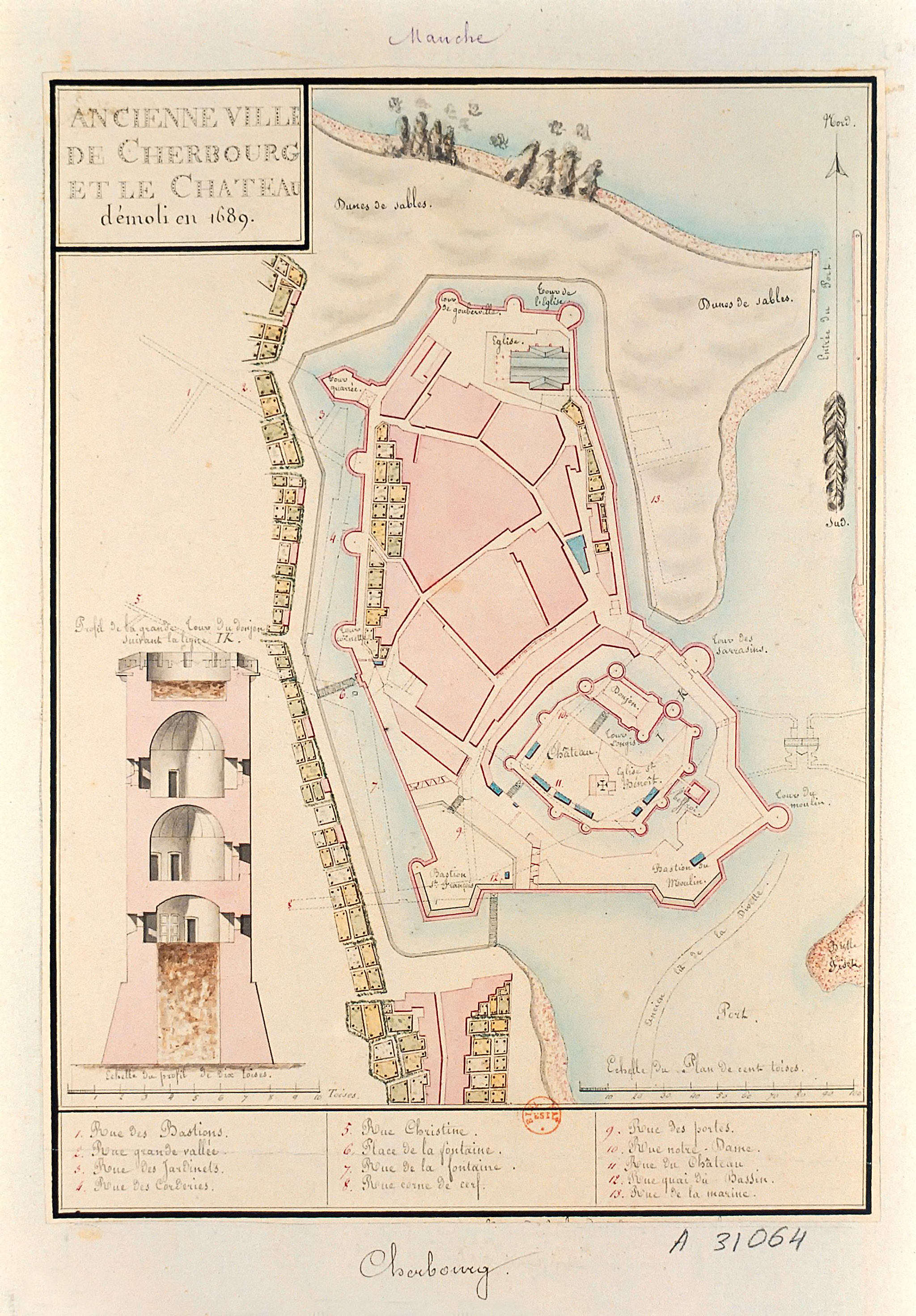
Map of Cherbourg and the castle demolished in 1689.

The Cotentin, conquered by Quintus Titurius Sabinus in 56 BC, was divided between the pagus constantiensis ("County of Coutances") and the pagus coriovallensis ("County of Coriallo"), within Gallia Lugdunensis. Coriallo housed a small garrison and a castrum was built on the left bank of the Divette as an element of the Litus saxonicum, after Saxon raids at the beginning of the fourth century.

In 497, the village was sold with all of Armorica to Clovis. It was evangelised by Saint Éreptiole in 432, then by Saint Exuperat, Saint Leonicien, and finally Saint Scubilion in 555. In 870, Saint Clair, landing in Kent, was ordained priest of Cherbourg and established a hermitage in the surrounding forest.

After several Norman raids in the ninth century, Cherbourg was attached to the Duchy of Normandy along with the Cotentin, in 933, by William Longsword. The Danish King Harold moved there in 946.

In the face of English threats, Richard III of Normandy strengthened the fortifications of the castle at the same time as those of the other major strongholds of Cotentin. In 1053, the city was one of the four main cities of the duchy of William the Conqueror to receive an annuity in perpetuity for the maintenance of one hundred needy.

In 1139, during the struggle for succession to the Anglo-Norman Crown, Cherbourg fell after two months of siege to the troops of Stephen of England before being retaken in 1142 by Geoffrey of Anjou, whose wife, Empress Matilda, three years later founded the Abbaye Notre-Dame du Vœu.

During the conquest of Normandy by Philip II of France, Cherbourg fell without a fight in 1204. The city was sacked in 1284 and 1293, the abbey and the Hôtel-Dieu looted and burned, but the castle, where the population was entrenched, resisted. Following these ravages, Philip IV of France fortified the city in 1300.

Its strategic position, a key to the kingdom along with Calais as a bridgehead for invasion by the English and French, the town was much disputed during the Hundred Years' War. Having one of the strongest castles in the world according to Froissart, it changed ownership six times as a result of transactions or seats, never by force of arms. The fortress resisted the soldiers of Edward III in 1346.

In February 1354, Cherbourg was transferred by John II of France to Charles II of Navarre with the bulk of the Cotentin. The city was of Navarre from 1354 to 1378, and Charles II stayed in Cherbourg on several occasions. In 1378, the city was besieged by Charles V of France as the rest of the Norman possessions of the King of Navarre, but in vain. Navarre troops who had dropped the County of Évreux and the Cotentin were entrenched in Cherbourg, already a difficult taking, and defended it against French attacks. In June 1378, having lost ground in Normandy, Charles II of Navarre rented Cherbourg in 1378 to Richard II of England for a period of three years. Bertrand du Guesclin besieged it for six months using many machines of war, but abandoned the siege in December 1378. The King of England then refused to return the city to the Navarrese, despite the efforts of Charles II. It was only his son Charles III of Navarre who recovered it in 1393. In 1404, it was returned to Charles VI of France, in exchange for the Duchy of Nemours.

Fallen in 1418 to the hands of the English, Cherbourg, the last English possession of the Duchy of Normandy after the Battle of Formigny, was retaken by France following the Siege of Cherbourg in 1450.

On 28 April 1532, Cherbourg was visited with great fanfare by Francis I and the dauphin. At that time, Cherbourg was described by Gilles de Gouberville as a fortified town of 4,000 residents, protected by drawbridges at the three main gates which were permanently guarded and closed from sunset until dawn. Inside the city walls, the castle, itself protected by wide moats and equipped with a keep and twelve towers, was south-east of the city. Outside and to the south of the city walls, the suburb along the Divette was frequented by sailors.

Cherbourg was not affected by the wind of the Reformation that divided Normandy, consolidated and heavily guarded by Matignon, Henry III thanked his defence against the troops of Montgomery, as lieutenant-general of Normandy and Governor of Cherbourg in 1578, and then marshal the following year. The bourgeois also remained loyal to Henry III and Henry IV, when Normandy was mostly held by the Catholic League.

=== 17th to 19th century ===
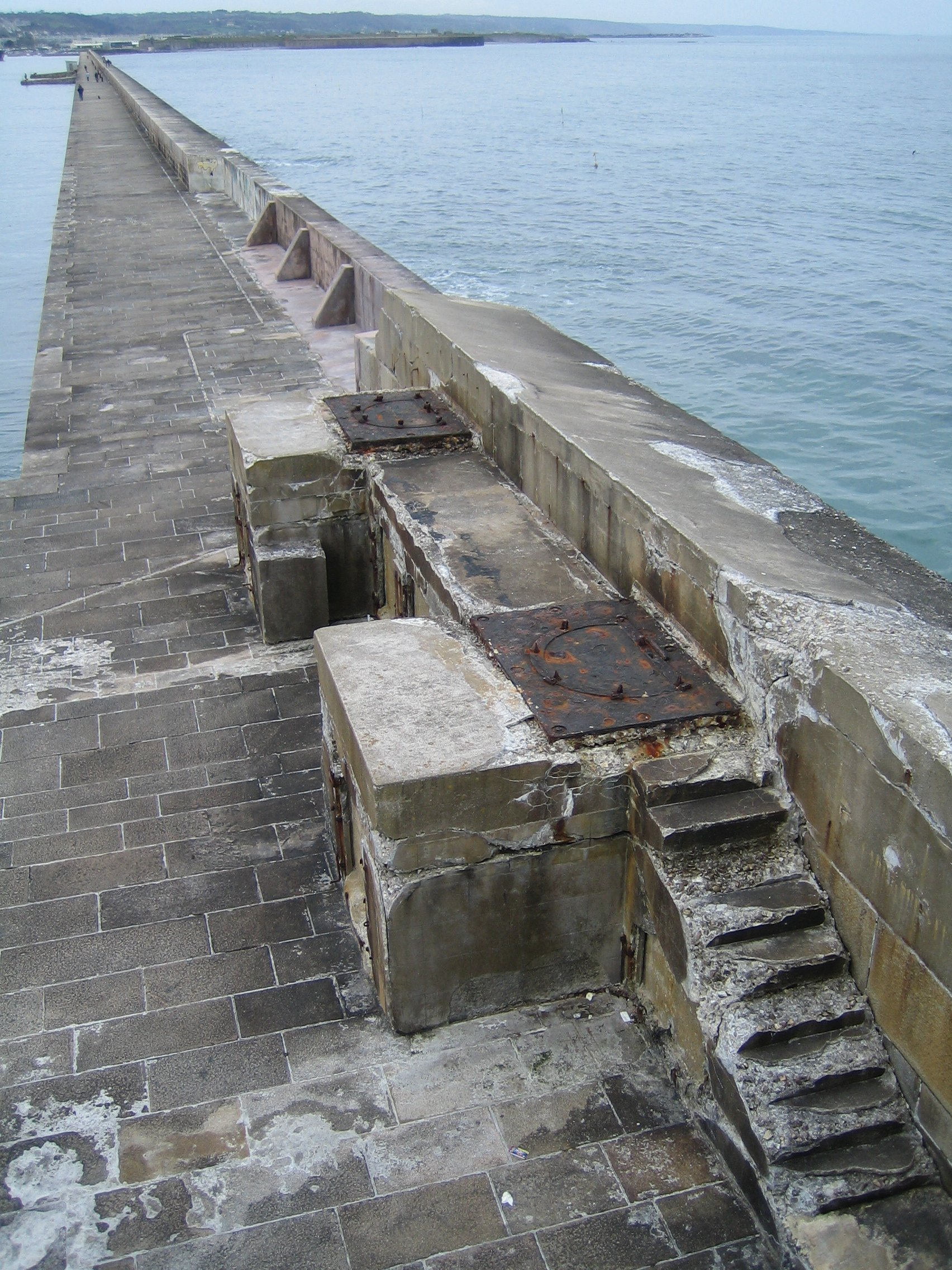
The western sea wall, known as "de Querqueville".

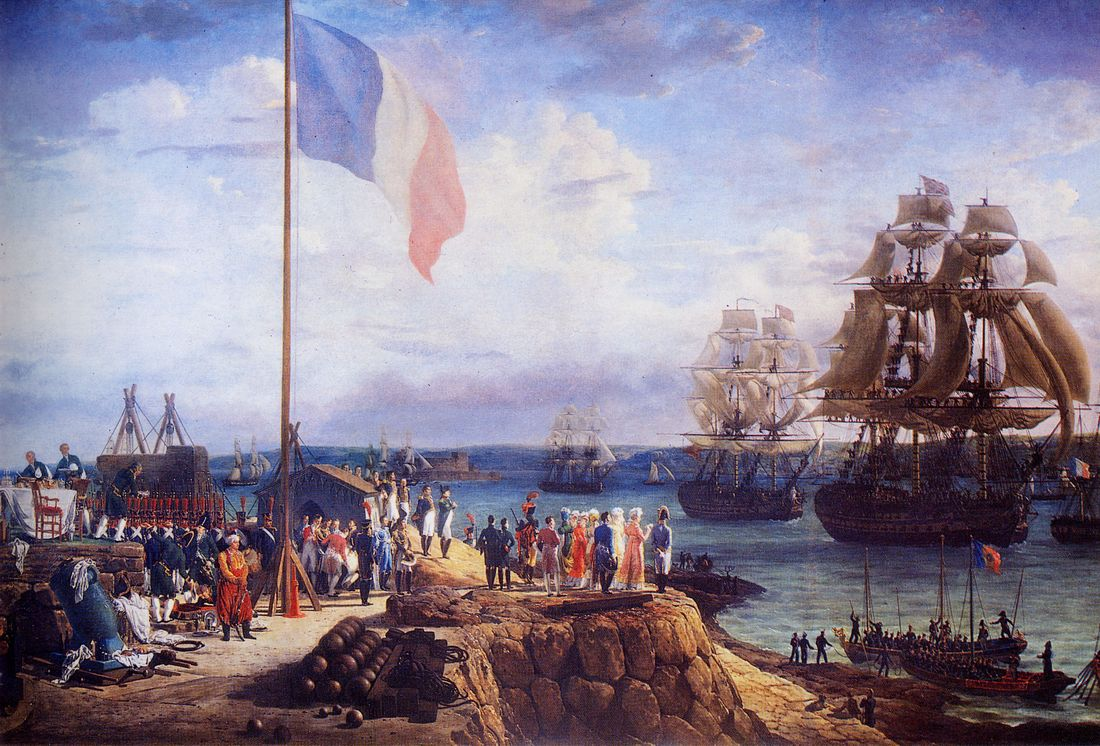
Napoléon and Marie Louise attending the parade of the squadron in Cherbourg in 1811.

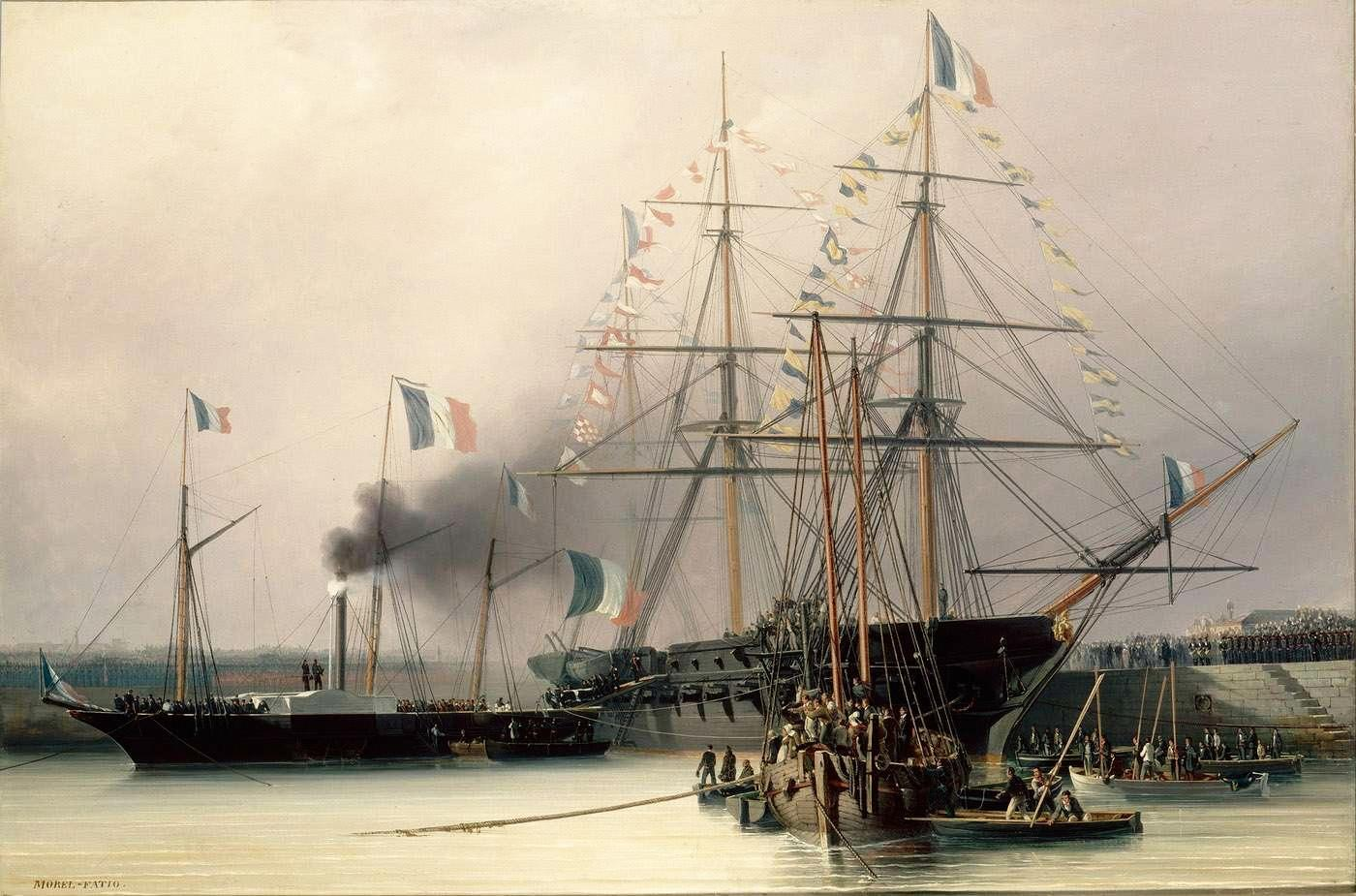
Transhipment of the remains of Napoleon I, Léon Morel-Fatio, 1841.

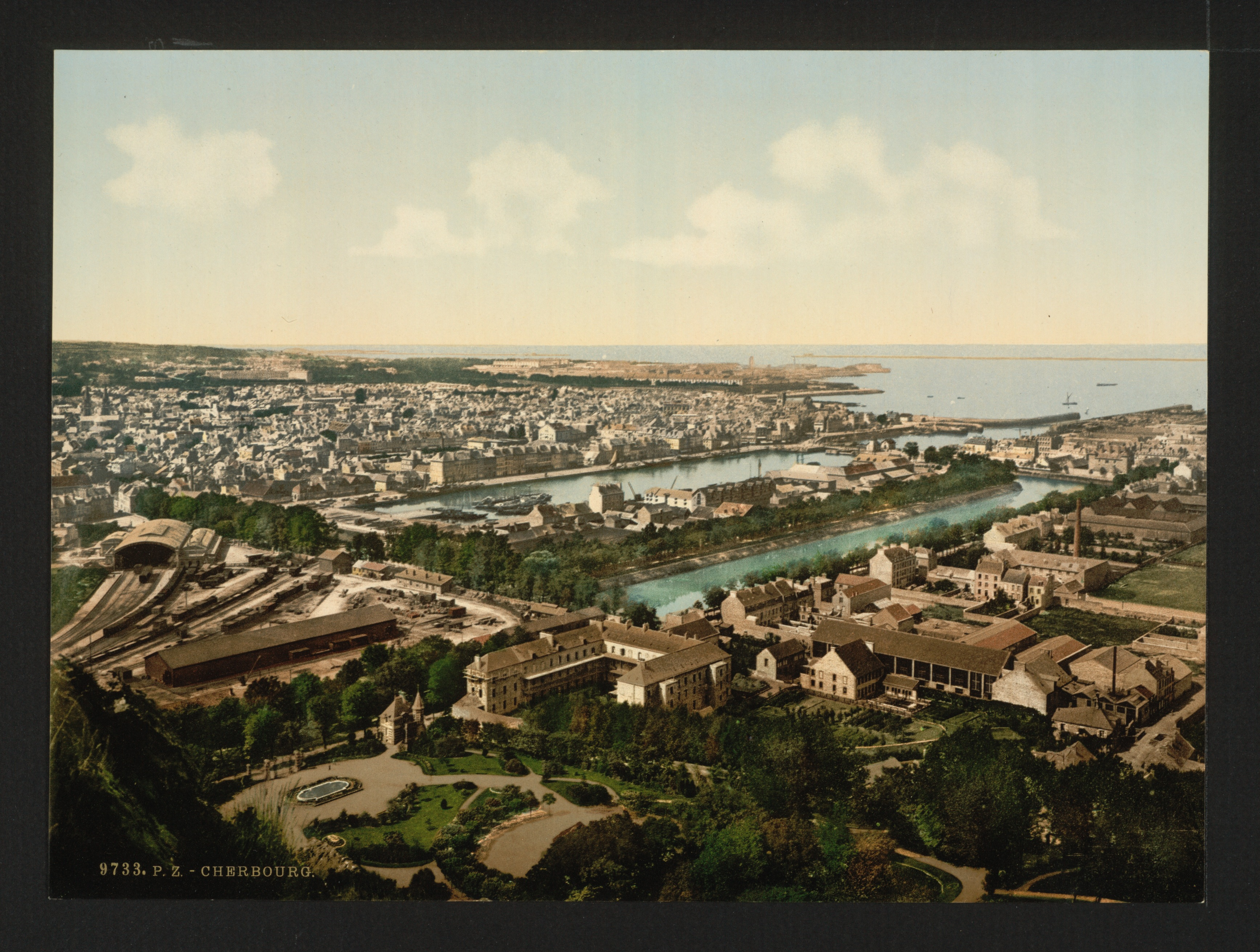
A general view of Cherbourg from the fort du Roule, around 1895

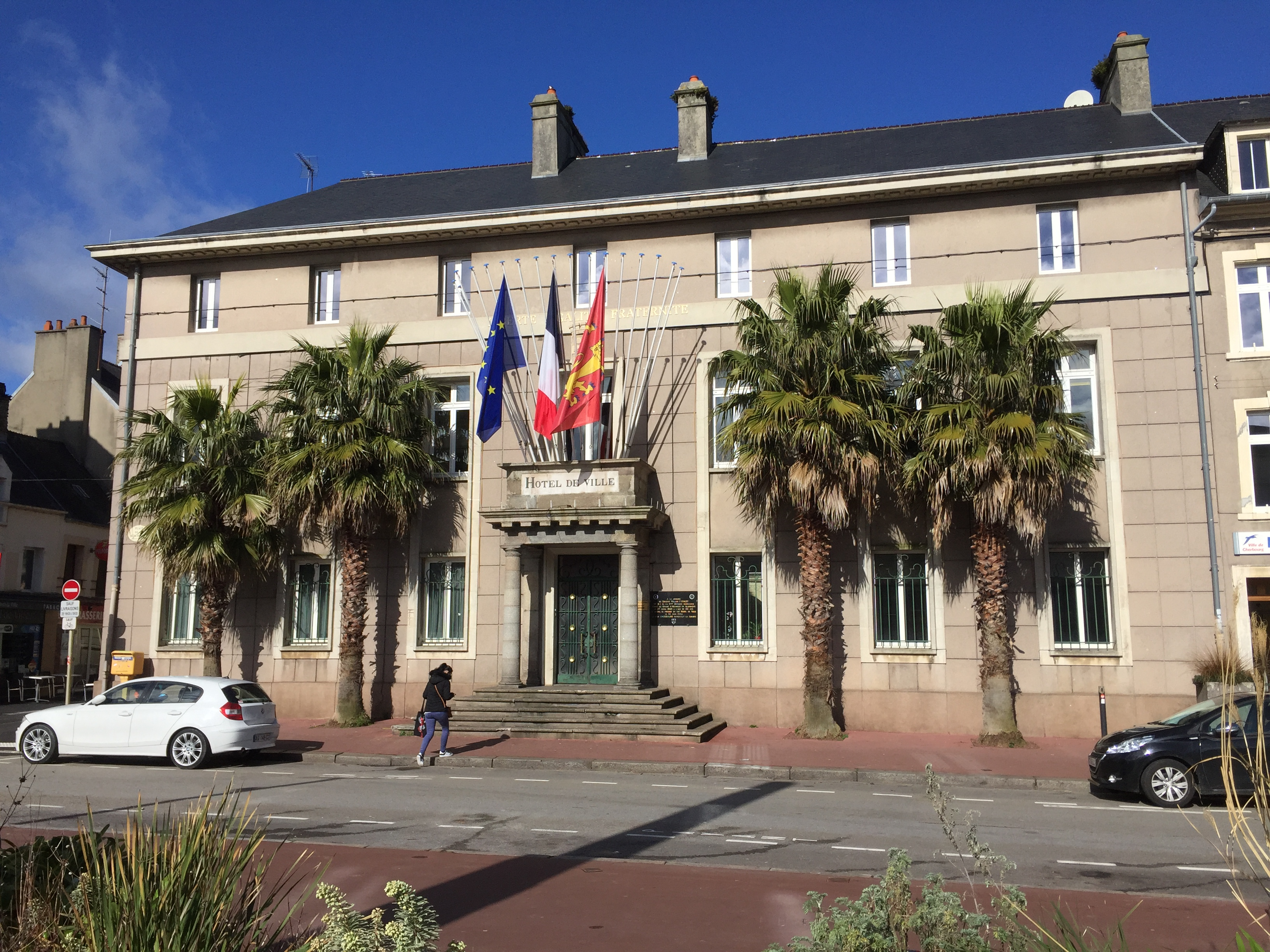
The Hôtel de Ville

To complement the two major ports of Brest on the Atlantic Ocean and Toulon on the Mediterranean Sea, Louis XIV wished to build a new port on the side of the English Channel, facing England, in order to shelter the passing ships. In 1686, Vauban offered to strengthen the fortifications of Cherbourg, and close Cherbourg Harbour with two sea walls, but preferred La Hogue for the establishment of a major military port. Fortifications and the castle development work began the following year but were stopped by the King in December 1688, influenced by Louvois and fear of English attacks. In the absence of these fortifications, the population of Cherbourg attended to the destruction of the three ships of Admiral Tourville at the end of the Battle of La Hogue.

The commercial port dug at the current position of the place Divette between 1739 and 1742, was devastated in August 1758 by an English attack under the orders of General Bligh and Admiral Howe. During the Seven Years' War, the British briefly occupied the town after the Raid on Cherbourg in 1758. The British destroyed military buildings and warehouses before departing. With the development of a new pool of trade in 1769, Cherbourg - a longstanding commercial port of minor importance, a city without a university or cultural activity, regularly looted, and having weak relations with Paris - acquired a weight in the Cotentin which translated, on the eve of the French Revolution, by the creation of networks of sociability by the middle-class united in associations - such as the Cherbourg Royal Academic Society in 1755 and the lodge "Faithful mason". The population increased from 800 feus (4,000 inhabitants) in Cherbourg and 95 in Octeville, around 1715, to 7,300 people in Cherbourg by 1778.

Louis XVI decided to relaunch the project of the port on the English Channel. After many delays, it was decided in 1779 to build a 4 km (2.5 mi)-long sea wall between île Pelée and the tip of Querqueville, using a method developed by Louis-Alexandre de Cessart, a pier of 90 wooden cones of 20 m (66 ft) by 20, filled with rubble, connected by iron chains. The first cone was immersed on 6 June 1784, and the King attended the launching of the ninth cone on 22 June. But the technique did not withstand storms and was abandoned in 1788 in favour of scuttling old warships to backfill lost stones touted by La Bretonnière. However, the reduction of subsidies and the revolutionary events slowed work down, until its suspension in 1792. A new Hôtel de Ville (town hall) was completed in 1804.

First Consul Bonaparte wanted to turn Cherbourg into a major military port, for the invasion of the United Kingdom. He charged Joseph Cachin with the resumption of the work of the sea wall, the digging of military outer harbour, and the construction of the new arsenal. After a visit in 1811, Napoleon made Cherbourg a maritime prefecture, a chef-lieu of the Arrondissements of the Manche department and the seat of a court of first instance.

The work of the central sea wall, interrupted again between 1813 and 1832, ended in 1853, the east and west sea walls in 1895. The Charles X docks (begun in 1814 - 290 × 220 × 18 metres) and Napoleon III (started in 1836 - 420 × 200 × 18 m) of the military port were respectively opened on 25 August 1829, in the presence of the Dauphin, and 7 August 1858, by the Imperial couple. The work of the sea wall was concluded by the construction of the small harbour (Homet sea wall, 1899-1914 and sea wall of the Flemings, 1921–1922).

The work of the port led the intensification and spread of a modernising and developing Cherbourg, while contractors, owners, and local merchants were getting richer. Rural village housing scattered in hamlets made up around large farms (La Crespiniere, La Prevallerie, Grimesnil, La Gamacherie, etc.), connected between them and the Saint-Martin Church by a network of paths, Octeville became chef-lieu of the canton in 1801 (Decree of 23 Vendémiaire, year X) and also its population, to increase by the influx of workers who came to build the port of Cherbourg and work at the Arsenal. After the creation of the Route des Pieux (current Rue Salengro and Rue Carnot), the town was formed around an homogenised street-village then urbanising at the beginning of the 20th century.

On 16 August 1830, King Charles X, dethroned, departed into exile from the military port of Cherbourg aboard the Great Britain, leaving room for the July Monarchy. After seeing moor in its harbour Le Luxor carrying the Obelisk of Luxor in August 1833, Cherbourg welcomed the return of the remains of Napoleon to France aboard the Belle Poule. On 4 August 1858, an equestrian statue of Napoleon by the sculptor Armand Le Véel, was erected on the occasion of the visit of Napoleon III to the inauguration of the railway line from Cherbourg to Paris.

On 19 June 1864, a naval engagement in the American Civil War was held off the coast of Cherbourg: The warship of the Confederates, the CSS Alabama was sunk by the ship of the Union USS Kearsarge after two hours of fighting [see the Battle of Cherbourg (1864)], under the eye of thousands of spectators, who had arrived by train for the inauguration of the casino. Visualizing the fight from a sailboat, Manet immortalised it in The Battle of the Kearsarge and the Alabama. In November 1984, the French Navy mine hunter Circé discovered a wreck under nearly 60 m (200 ft) of water off Cherbourg. The location of the wreck (WGS84) was 49°45'147N / 001°41'708W. Captain Max Guerout later confirmed the wreck to be of the CSS Alabama.

=== Early 20th century ===
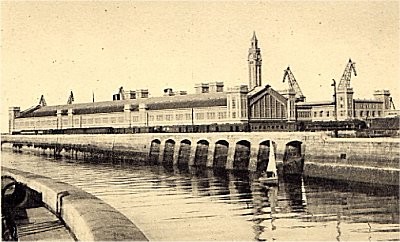
The gare maritime in 1933.

From 1847, the geographical and technical properties of the port of Cherbourg attracted shipping companies linking European ports to the east coast of the United States. At the end of the 1860s, the ships of the Royal Mail Steam Packet Company and the Hamburg America Line anchored in the harbour before crossing the Atlantic. After leaving Southampton, England, the RMS Titanic made its first stop at Cherbourg on 10 April 1912, during its maiden voyage, where an additional 274 passengers embarked and 24 passengers disembarked ending their trip. In 1913, Cherbourg received 500 ships and 70,000 passengers.

On 31 July 1909, Tsar Nicholas II and French president Armand Fallières met officially in Cherbourg to reinforce the Franco-Russian Alliance.

During the First World War, traffic was completely suspended. Cherbourg became the place of arrival for equipment and the British and American troops, and for departure on leave and injuries. The military port experienced an increase in activity, and the garrison stationed at Cherbourg was reinforced. The port infrastructures were developed to receive coal and oil required for the conflict. Traffic doubled, reaching 600,000 tons in 1918.

Transatlantic transit resumed in the aftermath of the war with the British, American and Dutch transatlantic companies. To welcome the best stopovers, the Chamber of Commerce built a deep water port, a new ferry terminal, and an area dedicated to loading, unloading and storage of goods in the field of Mielles. Cherbourg became the first port of migration in Europe, and Cunard Line, White Star Line and Red Star Line companies united to build the Hôtel Atlantique [Atlantic Hotel] intended to receive emigrants before crossing. At the same time, the downtown was renovated, especially in the architectural projects of René Levesque, Drancey and René Levavasseur. However, the 1929 crisis put an end to the transatlantic peak.

=== Second World War ===
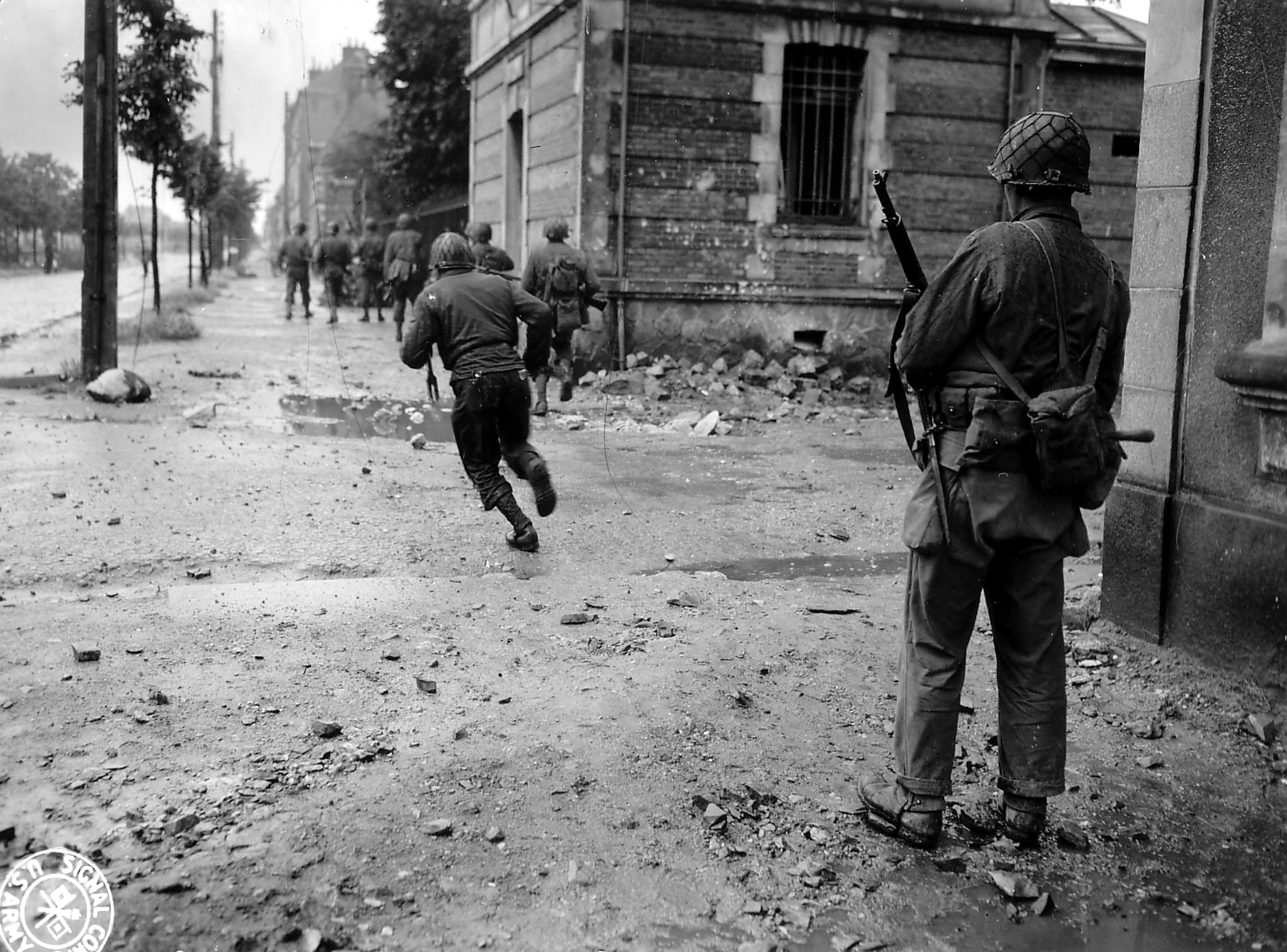
American soldiers engaged in street fighting, on the Avenue de Paris.

During the Second World War (1939–1945), the German Army occupied the north of France and fortified the coastline against invasion. As a deep-water port, Cherbourg was of strategic importance, very heavily protected against seaborne assault.

German troops arrived in the outskirts of Cherbourg on 17 June 1940, towards the end of the Battle of France. Two days later, the City Council declared the city open, and Generalmajor Erwin Rommel, commander of the 7th Panzer Division, received the surrender of the city from the hands of the maritime prefect, Vice-Admiral Jules Le Bigot, who had earlier destroyed submarines under construction at the arsenal and East Fort.

Four years later, Cherbourg, the only deep-water port in the region, was the primary objective of the American troops who had landed at Utah Beach during the Battle of Normandy. The Battle of Cherbourg was required to give the Allies a point of logistic support for human resupply and material of the troops. American troops encircled the city on 21 June 1944. At the end of furious street fighting and bitter resistance from the Fort du Roule, Generalleutnant Karl-Wilhelm von Schlieben, Konteradmiral Walter Hennecke and 37,000 German soldiers surrendered on 29 June to Major General Joseph Lawton Collins, Commanding General (CG) of the U.S. VII Corps. After a month of demining and repairs by American and French engineers, the port, completely razed by the Germans and the bombing, welcomed the first Liberty ships and became, until the victory of 1945, the busiest port in the world, with traffic double that of the Port of New York . It was also the endpoint of the gasoline and diesel which crossed the English Channel via the underwater pipeline PLUTO (Pipe Line Under The Ocean), and the starting point of the Red Ball Express, the truck transport circuit to Chartres.

Cherbourg was returned to France by the Americans on 14 October 1945. It was cited in the Order of the Army on 2 June 1948 and received the Croix de guerre with Palm.

=== Postwar ===
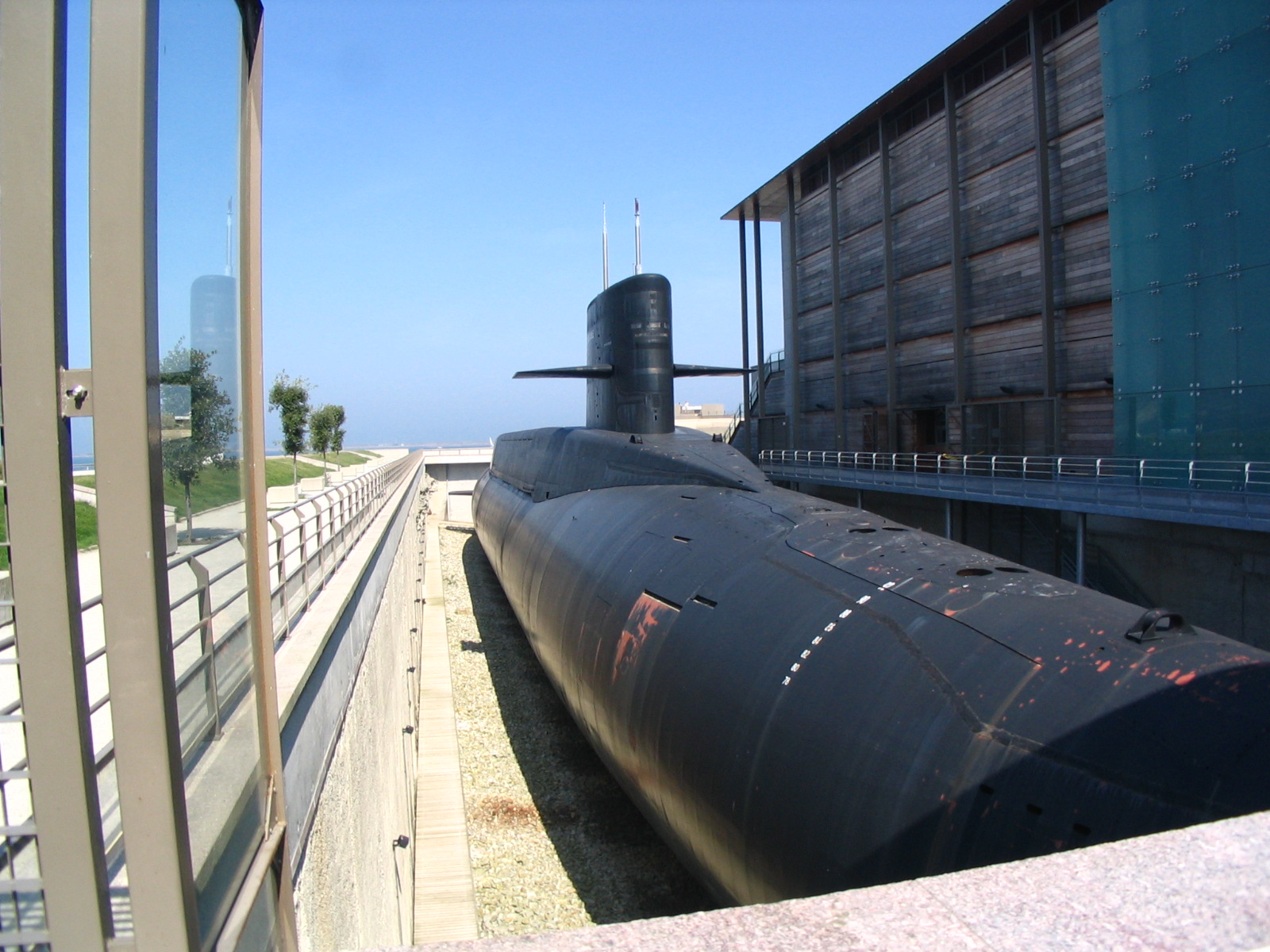
Le Redoutable, a symbol of the flourishing local economy of the postwar period, became a tourist attraction in 2002.

The wartime destruction was mainly concentrated around the military port in Cherbourg but had hit 60% of Octeville. Thanks to the urgency of the port reconstruction, economic activity resumed quickly. Cherbourg, headed by former SFIO Minister René Schmitt, built much social housing. The postwar boom led to the modernisation of the economy and a greater role for female employment. Under the leadership of General de Gaulle, Cherbourg became the hub of nuclear ballistic missile submarine construction from 1964, including the first, Le Redoutable, which was launched in 1967. Félix Amiot's shipyard Constructions Mécaniques de Normandie, specialised in military armaments, became famous during the Christmas of 1969 in an episode of the Cherbourg Project.

Incorporated in 1970, the Communauté urbaine de Cherbourg gathered together Cherbourg and Octeville, La Glacerie, Tourlaville, Querqueville and Équeurdreville-Hainneville.

From the end of the 1960s, the nuclear industry emerged through the construction sites of the La Hague reprocessing plant and the Flamanville Nuclear Power Plant in addition to submarines of the DCN. A union of trade unions, left-wing activists and environmentalists, formed around the fear of the "nuclearisation" of Nord-Cotentin, crystallised in January 1979 when the Pacific Fisher landed with the first spent nuclear waste from Japan. On the eve of the 1980s, the Cherbourg agglomeration was hit by several violent social conflicts, particularly due to the closure of the Babcock factories.

=== Turn of the millennium ===
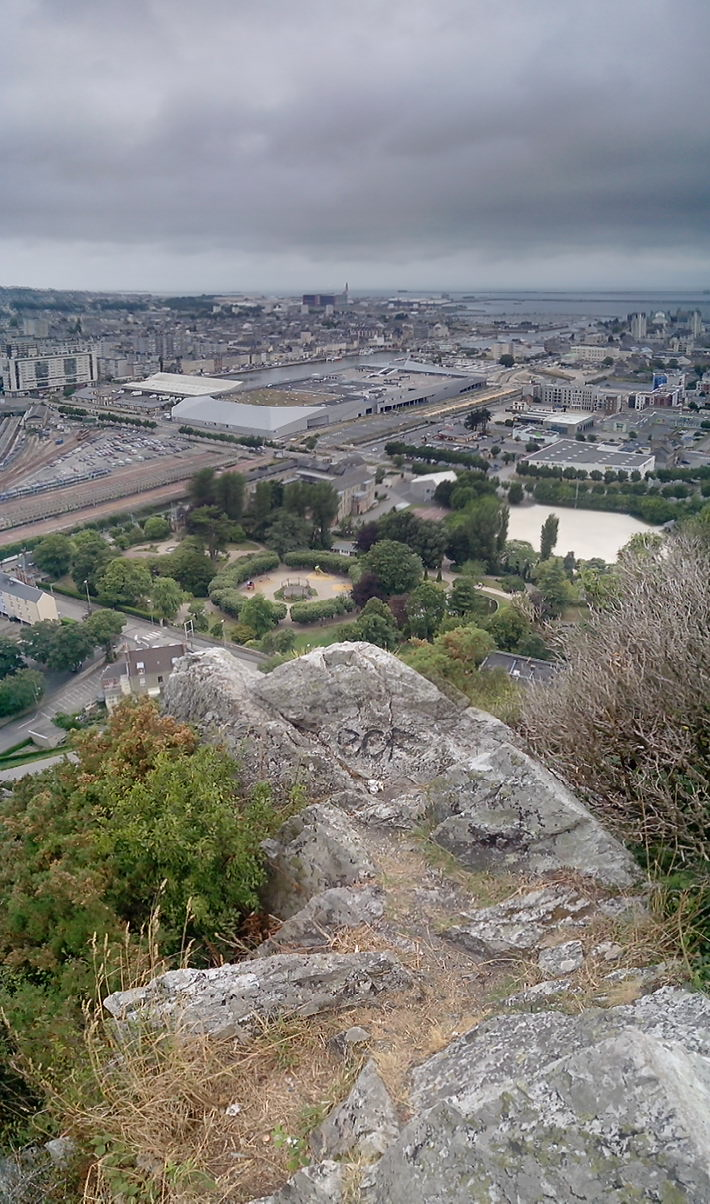
A recent view of downtown Cherbourg.

The major decisions of the public authorities, on which Cherbourg has depended for many centuries, and the nuclear industry, caused a deep economic crisis in the 1990s. The Arsenal was drastically downsized, the Northern Fleet (FLONOR) moved to Brest in 1992, and the maritime hospital closed. UIE, Burty, CMN, Socoval and Alcatel accumulated social plans or closings. Under the auspices of the urban community, the agglomeration developed its academic offerings with the IUT of Cherbourg-Manche, the School of Engineers of Cherbourg and a branch of the University of Caen, which complemented INTECHMER and the School of Fine Arts.

The new millennium began with the creation of a new commune. Cherbourg-Octeville was created on 1 March 2000 through the joining of Cherbourg and Octeville, following a local referendum within "Grand Cherbourg". The city revived its tourist and maritime identity through the Cité de la Mer and the opening to the public of the Redoubtable, and became the home of stopovers for cruises and nautical events. The urban renewal operation "between land and sea", with an emphasis on the commercial and touristic attractiveness of the city and the Bassins Quarter, as well as the economic specialisation in boating, emerged. Meanwhile, the traditional activities of the port (passengers, freight and fishing) were in crisis.

=== Miscellany ===
The Norman language writer Alfred Rossel, a native of Cherbourg, composed many songs which form part of the heritage of the region. Rossel's song "Sus la mér" ("on the sea") is often sung as a regional patriotic song. The local dialect is known as Cotentinais.

La Glacerie was named for glass factory. In 1655, Louis Lucas de Néhou built a glass factory which produced windows and mirrors for such buildings as the Galerie des Glaces and Château de Versailles. The factory in La Glacerie was destroyed by Allied bombardments in 1944 during the Normandy invasion.

Cherbourg was the first site outside the United States to be designated as an American Civil War Heritage Site by the Civil War Preservation Trust because a sea battle was fought nearby in 1864 by Union and Confederate warships. See the Battle of Cherbourg (1864).

== Population ==
=== Urban fabric ===
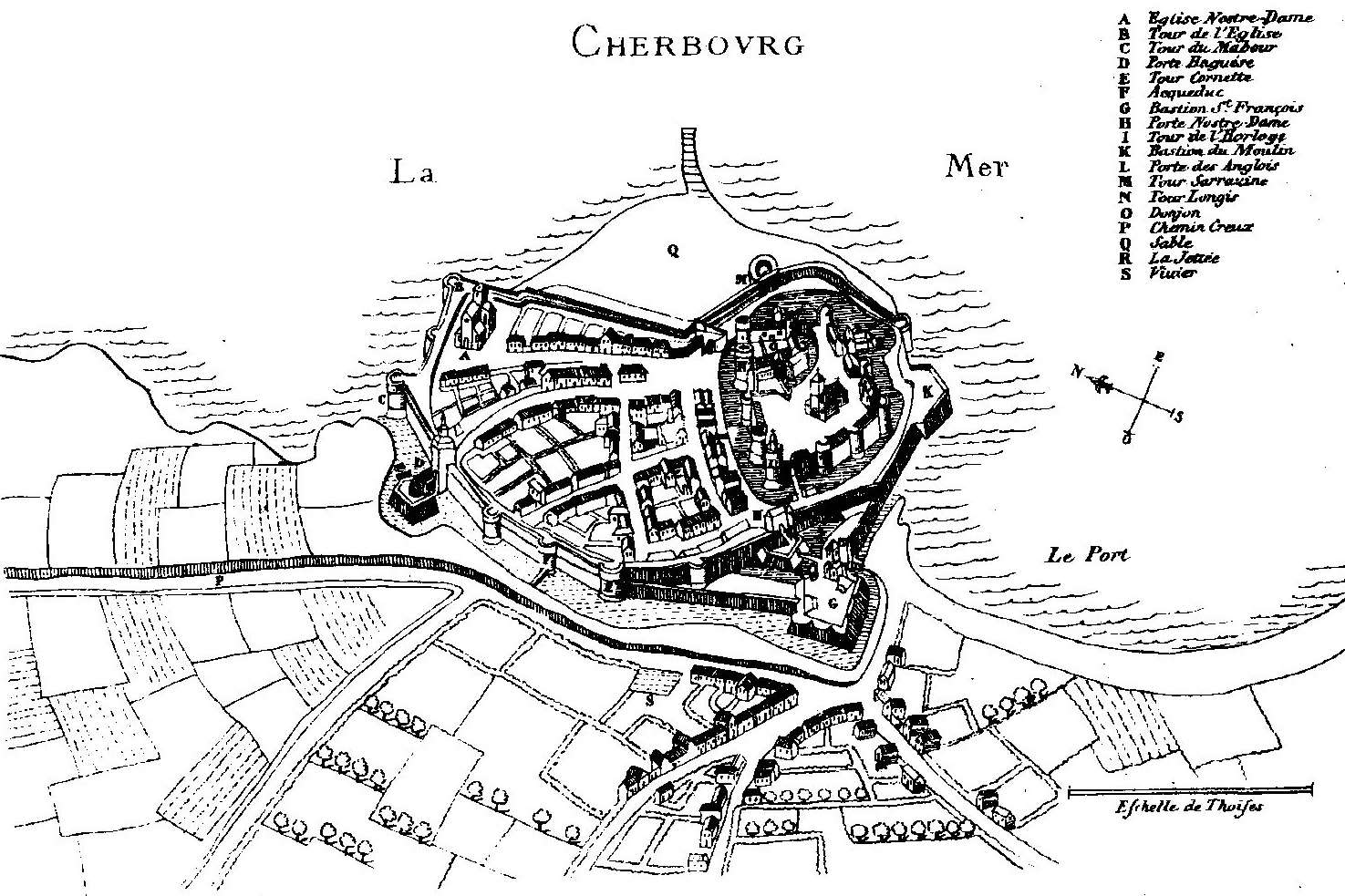
Plan of the fortress of Cherbourg by Jacques Gomboust, 1657

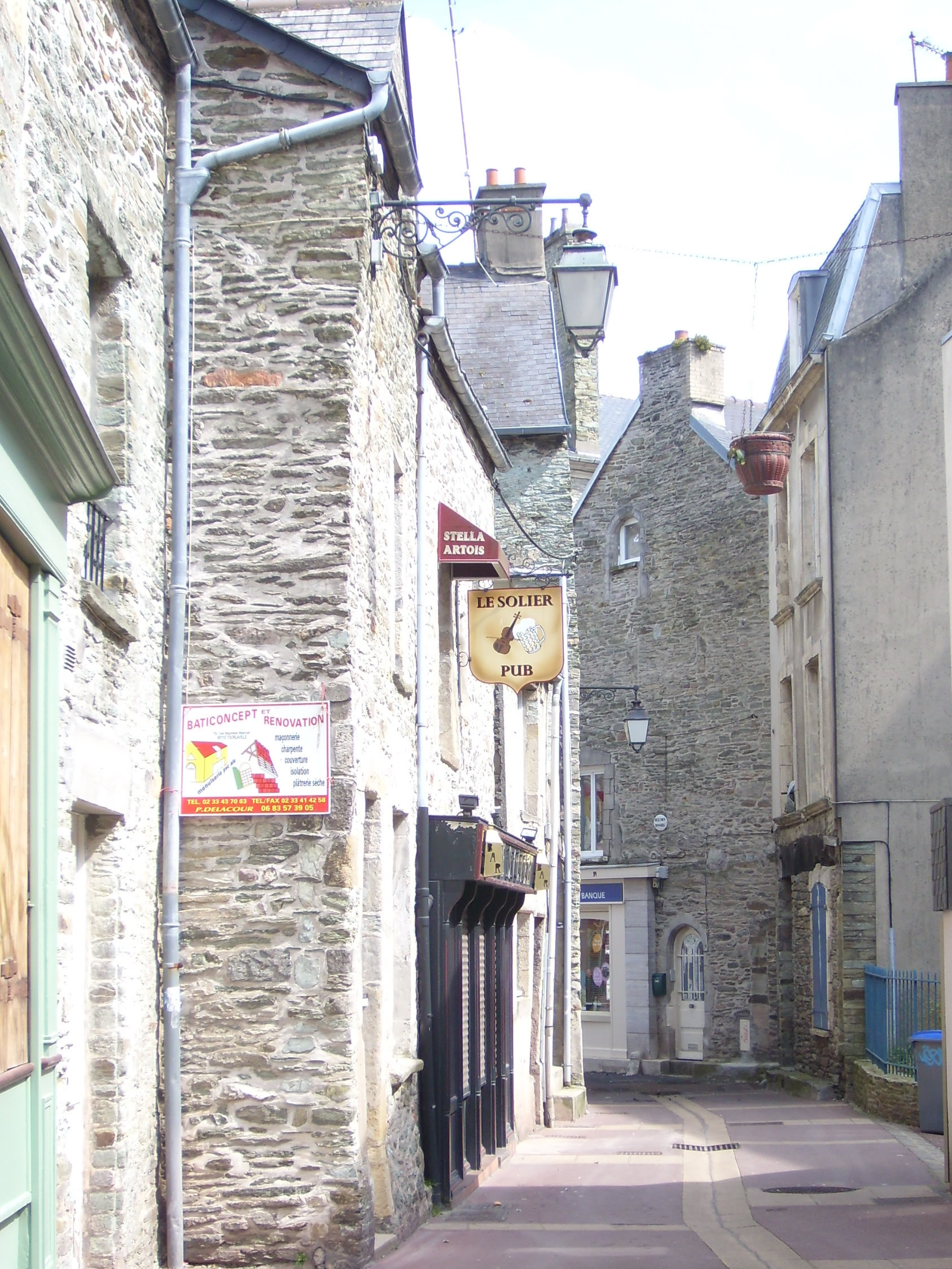
The Rue des Fossés, remnant of a street of medieval Cherbourg

Cherbourg originally developed on the left bank of the mouth of the Divette, around the castle. Traces of the ancient fortress are rare in the modern city; the fortification was located in the area bounded by the Rue de la Marine, Quai de Caligny, the Foch, Gambetta, Albert-Mahieu and François-Lavieille streets, and La République and La Trinité squares. The city had five streets: Grande Rue, Rue de la Trinité (today, Tour-Carrée), the Rue du Nouet (to the Blé), the Rue au Fourdray and Rue Onfroy (of trade), and a dozen boëls (alleys). These five medieval streets were transformed into pedestrian streets in the 1980s. Until the destruction of the city walls, the main road called rue de-devant-le-château, was built on its west (east is bordered by ditches) with several houses with arcades, called soliers. After the dismantling of the walls, inside which lived three-fifths of the population, the city extended up to its natural boundaries at the end of the 17th century: the Divette in the east, and Chantereine stream in the west. During the 19th century, it extended to the neighbouring annexed territories of Tourlaville and Équeurdreville. Its rapid growth from the end of the 18th century was spoken of by Jean Fleury, in 1839, in that it "offers almost everywhere the appearance of a new town; the old streets occupy little space, and the others are generally large and airy, the fountains numerous [...]. Cherbourg has 10 squares, 59 streets, 12 cul-de-sacs and 5 passages."

Damaged during all eras, rebuilt in piecemeal, the city has no architectural unity. Shale, extracted from the quarries of the agglomeration, is the traditional material of construction. With widespread coverage in the northern Cotentin, it is also used in Cherbourg for the walls in the city, apparent or often covered with a grayish or sometimes colourful coating. The frames are then Valognes stone (limestone), pink granite of Fermanville, or brick, and the underpinnings Armorican sandstone of the Roule and the Fauconniere. The expansion of the city from the 18th century contributed to the diversity of materials. The use of Caen stone and industrial brick was necessary under the Second Empire, while vernacular architecture disappeared gradually in these years in favour of a more homogeneous and Parisian style.

Cherbourg and its agglomeration urbanised around the ports and along the coast. With post-war reconstruction and the economic development of the Trente Glorieuses, the city is experiencing a crisis of housing due to the demographic boom, having built on the last vacant land. Indeed, a 1954 report evaluated 1,000 inhabitant families living in slums and called for 1,500 housing units. Then out of land Cité du Casino in 1957 and the Cité Fougère in 1958, then in 1959 all of the Amont-Quentin, Charcot-Spanel and Cité Chantereyne to accommodate the families of the engineers and officers of the Arsenal.

Port Chantereyne and the Mielles lands are reclaimed from the sea, the Place Divette and Boulevard Schuman are created at the site of the old fairground. However, at that time, the change mainly affected nearby villages that formed an agglomeration in less than forty years. Octeville, a dispersed habitat until the 18th century, and urbanised during the work of the port around a central street, saw the housing estate of the Provinces settle on the heights of la Fauconniere and triple its population in 20 years. Several estates also emerging at Tourlaville, La Glacerie, Querquerville and Equeurdreville, amending the physiognomy of a suburb which densified. This urbanisation resulted in the dilution of the geographic and sociological boundaries of the agglomeration resulting in the creation in 1970 of the urban community until the merger of Cherbourg and Octeville in 2000.

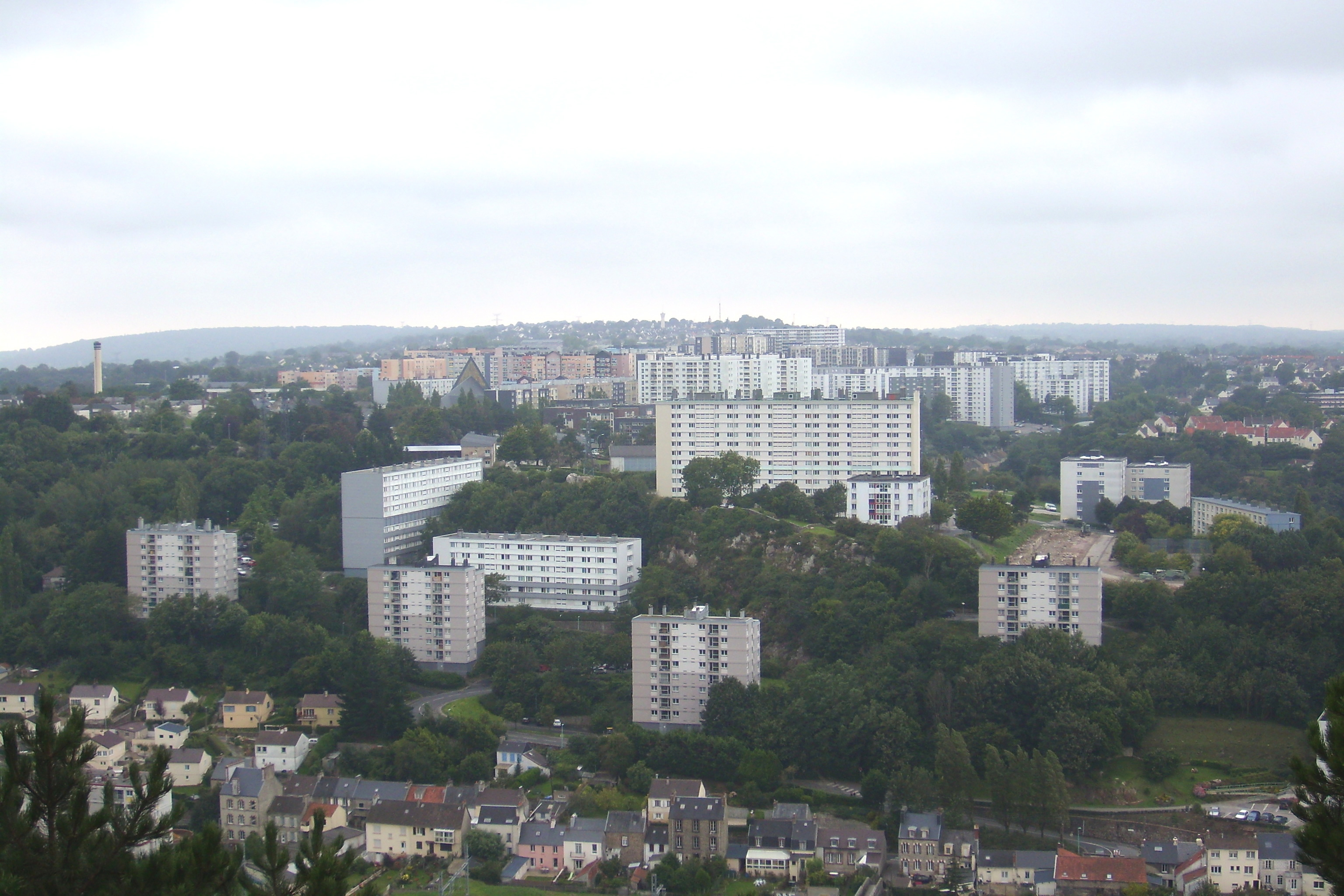
The Amont Quentin and the Provinces, born in the 1960s and 1970s, currently under renovation.

Following this merger, a plan of urban renewal named "Between Land and Sea" was launched in 2002 on the quarters of Bassins, of the Amont-Quentin and the Provinces to homogenise the territory of the newly amalgamated city. The Bassins quarter, released by the channelling of the Divette and the filling of the retaining channel, is expected to profoundly transform the commercial landscape of the city, carried by the construction of a new shopping centre and the renovation of downtown. On the heights, seven HLM tower blocks are intended for demolition to improve social housing. A 3-star hotel and the relocation of the casino is also planned. At Avenue Carnot, the former Grouard warehouses must leave room for parking and a place through from the wharf from the Quai de l'Entrepôt to the Pasteur Hospital, to 180 dwellings by Presqu'île habitat and ADIM (Vinci company) then 100 extra in a second round of development.

The administrative quarters are:

- Downtown, historic heart of Cherbourg, with the inner city and the districts of La Polle and the Vœu, dating from the 19th century.
- The Val-de-Saire, annexed in 1811, beyond the Divette and swing-bridge.
- Sud-est, corresponding to the districts of du Roule and Maupas, traditionally for workers.
- The Amont Quentin-Provinces, on the heights of the city, built from the late 1950s (essentially HLM tower blocks).
- Octeville-Bourg, from both sides of the Salengro and Barbusse streets.
- Ouest, western part of the former municipality of Octeville.

Since 1996, Cherbourg-Octeville is covered by a sensitive urban zone on the expanded area of the Provinces.

=== Demography ===
The construction of the dam and the military port has brought an important flow of workers and soldiers. Cherbourg and Octeville have seen their populations quadruple in a century. Cherbourg had 43,000 inhabitants at the beginning of the 20th century. During this century, Cherbourg lost some 15,000 inhabitants, while Octeville grew continuously, with an explosion in the 1960s and 1970s, during the construction of the housing estates.

According to estimates from INSEE for 2018, Cherbourg-Octeville has 35,545 inhabitants. It is the largest city of the Manche department, and second of Lower Normandy (after Caen), surpassing Alençon, which had been second before the amalgamation. Cherbourg concentrated 7.7% of the departmental population, twice as much as the prefecture, Saint-Lô, while the agglomeration represents 17% and the urban area 23.5%.

The depopulation of the city-centre of the agglomeration was one of the main topics of the campaign for the municipal elections of 2008. In addition to the battle of figures on the number of lost inhabitants, the three candidates, Bernard Cazeneuve (PS), Jean Lemière (UMP) and Hervé Corbin (dissident UMP) indicated a new interest in this problem. The urbanisation of the Grimesnil/Monturbet zone, provided for the coming years, should logically bring extra population, although no one knows if it will be enough to stop the demographic bleeding.

Historical population

Year	Pop.	±% p.a.
1793	10,081	—
1800	11,389	+1.76%
1806	14,316	+3.89%
1821	15,655	+0.60%
1831	18,043	+1.43%
1836	19,315	+1.37%
1841	23,408	+3.92%
1846	26,949	+2.86%
1851	28,012	+0.78%
1856	38,309	+6.46%
1861	41,812	+1.77%

Year	Pop.	±% p.a.
1866	37,215	−2.30%
1872	35,580	−0.75%
1876	37,186	+1.11%
1881	35,691	−0.82%
1886	37,013	+0.73%
1891	38,554	+0.82%
1896	40,783	+1.13%
1901	42,938	+1.04%
1906	43,837	+0.42%
1911	43,731	−0.05%
1921	38,281	−1.32%

Year	Pop.	±% p.a.
1926	38,054	−0.12%
1931	37,461	−0.31%
1936	39,105	+0.86%
1946	40,042	+0.24%
1954	38,262	−0.57%
1962	37,486	−0.26%
1968	38,243	+0.33%
1975	32,536	−2.28%
1982	28,442	−1.90%
1990	27,121	−0.59%
1999	25,370	−0.74%

Population without double counting. Data for the former commune of Cherbourg.
Source: Ldh/EHESS/Cassini

Demographic changes of Cherbourg and Octeville compared, before their merger.
Year	1793	1800	1806	1821	1831	1836	1841	1846	1851	1856	1861
Cherbourg	10,081	11,389	14,316	15,655	18,043	19,315	23,408	26,949	28,012	38,309	41,812
Octeville	972	850	1,026	1,194	1,309	1,508	1,479	1,735	1,878	2,160	2,346

Year	1866	1872	1876	1881	1886	1891	1896	1901	1906	1911	1921
Cherbourg	37,215	35,580	37,186	35,691	37,013	38,554	40,783	42,938	43,837	43,731	38,281
Octeville	2,275	2,268	2,350	2,482	2,895	3,028	3,352	3,752	4,077	4,193	4,017

Year	1926	1931	1936	1946	1954	1962	1968	1975	1982	1990	1999
Cherbourg	38,054	37,461	39,105	40,042	38,262	37,486	38,243	32,536	28,442	27,121	25,370
Octeville	3,939	4,054	4,317	4,606	5,421	6,247	9,465	15,977	18,551	18,120	16,948
Number retained from 1962: population without doubles counting

Today, the neighbouring communes of the metropolitan area (Martinvast, Nouainville, Tonneville, Bretteville, etc.) are experiencing a demographic boost: The framework of life, rural and peaceful, in no way prevents the inhabitants from taking advantage of the infrastructure of the urban community. This problem, which is found in many French towns of this size, has led to the constitution of a Pays du Cotentin, the urban community who wish to so participate financially in the rich Community of communes of Les Pieux and the Community of communes of La Hague.

Since the merger between Cherbourg and Octeville, in February 2000, the inhabitants are officially called Cherbourgeois-Octevillais. Before, the inhabitants of Cherbourg was called the Cherbourgeois and those of Octeville were the Octevillais. It is likely that, with the merger, the latter disappears gradually in favour of Cherbourgeois. This would be similar to Équeurdrevillais (or sometimes Équeurdrais) for the nearby of Équeurdreville-Hainneville, which merged communes in 1965.

=== Housing ===
Cherbourg and Octeville have two different profiles. The first is the city centre, with varied habitat, the other a commune in suburbs, built quickly from the 1960s.

=== Parks and green spaces ===
The second half of the 19th century saw the creation of many English-style gardens. The first was due to Joseph Cachin created while he was responsible for the construction of the port, a private garden and a pond near the Divette, instead of the current railway line leading to the station. The temperate oceanic climate favours the naturalisation of southern and exotic plants such as palm trees, brought back by many Cherbourg sailors and explorers. Then, under the Third Republic, public gardens opened.

Today the city offers several green spaces:

- The Public Garden of 1.7 ha (4.2 acres), on the Avenue de Paris, was the first park to be offered to the population, in 1887. At the foot of the Montagne du Roule, it hosts many animals (sea lions, aviaries, deer, etc.). A commemorative site preferred by the municipality, it contains the monument to the dead inaugurated in 1924, the old portal of the Abbey of the Vœu, the bust of Jean-François Millet, and the last town bandstand. Two pavilions of angles constructed in 1889 limit the garden on the Avenue de Paris.
- The Emmanuel Liais Park 1 ha (2.5 acres) is the former garden of the Mayor of Cherbourg's house, designed in 1881 and opened in 1885. Bequeathed to the city upon his death, it is very wooded and has an observation tower, a plan of water containing water lilies and other aquatic plants and two greenhouses sheltering rare plants, including a rich collection of South American plants brought back from his travels and acclimated by Liais. It is labelled as a Remarkable Garden.
- The Montebello garden, opened in 1872 in the street of the same name, within the Napoleon III Quarter, was created at the initiative of the Horticultural Society of Cherbourg for its members. Open to the public since its inception, it contains bamboos, camellias and magnolias, and offers a chalet of bricks with beams.
- The Park of the Château des Ravalet 12 ha (30 acres), a Cherbourg-Octeville property on the territory of Tourlaville, was developed by the Vicomte René de Tocqueville from 1872, with an English garden and a woodland. The park and the greenhouse built between 1872 and 1875, which is home to palm, banana, cactus and lianas have been open since the acquisition by the city of Cherbourg in 1935, and are classified as historical monuments since 4 March 1996. Several water bodies welcome Black Swans and the aviaries are home to rare birds. An artificial waterfall was created in 1921.
- The Vallon sauvage [wild valley] contains hedgerows, wetlands, orchards and woodland in the heart of Octeville, in a natural area of 10 ha (25 acres).

A private garden, the Botanical Garden of the Roche Fauconnière, is also listed in the inventory of Historic Monuments since 29 December 1978. Established in 1873, it was embellished over generations by the Favier family.

The commune also has allotments, managed by associations: Vallon Sauvage, Fourches, Roquettes, Saint Sauveur and Redoute, which gives free land to its members.

In 2007, the municipality was awarded four flowers in the competition of flowery towns and villages. The beautification policy, which dates from 1995, resulted in obtaining a first flower, followed by a second in 2000 and third in 2002. It relies on public gardens, heirs to a local botanical heritage of over a century, 10,000 square metres (110,000 sq ft) of flower beds and 240 ha (590 acres) of green space on events such as Le Mois des Jardins et Presqu’île en Fleurs [The Month of Gardens and Peninsula in Flowers], and the annual distribution of geraniums to the resident volunteers.

== Economy ==
=== Historic ===
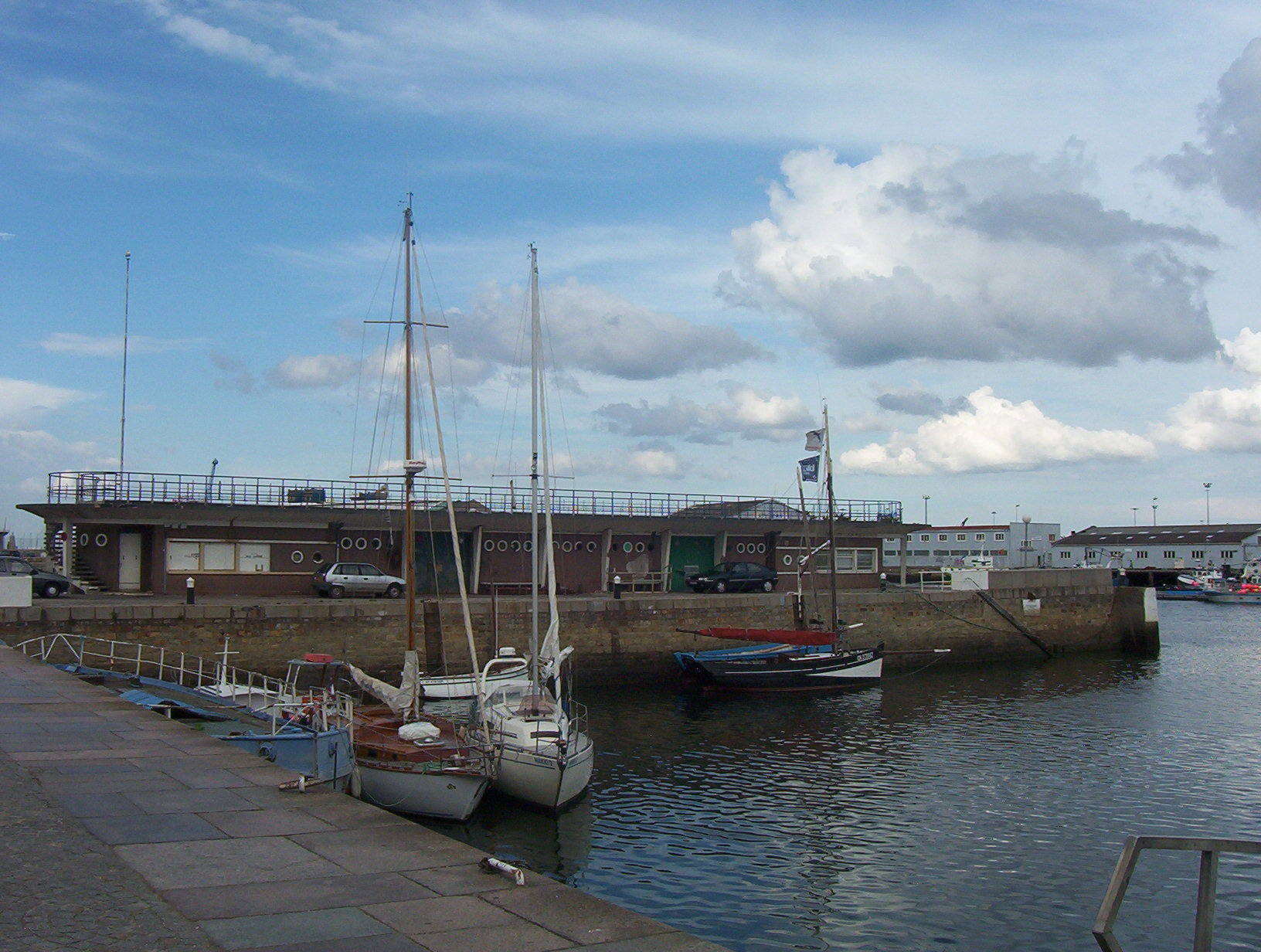
Old fish market of Cherbourg, Quai de Caligny.

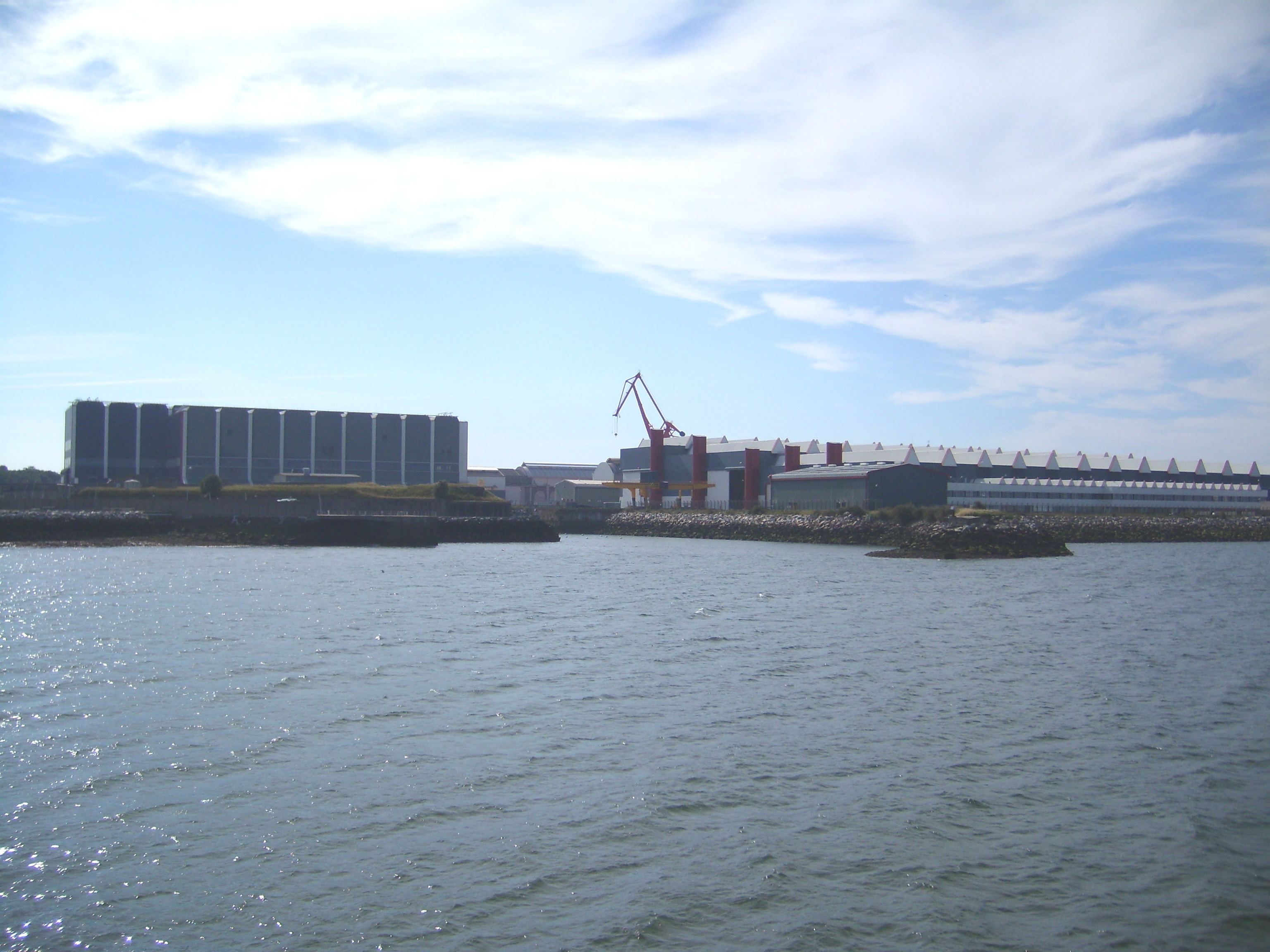
Sheds of the arsenal, seen from Chantereyne.

At the instigation of Colbert, the guild of drapers was founded on 16 April 1668, the manufacture of cloth produced two thousand pieces per year. Two years earlier, Colbert had also promoted the introduction of the glass factory in the forest of Tourlaville.

In the 18th century, the economic resources came mainly through maritime trade, the preparation of cured meats and the harbour and breakwater works, plus a moribund textile industry. On the eve of the French Revolution, salt was imported from Le Croisic along with British grain, and Littry coal. Exports were mainly to Britain (sheets and clothes) and the West Indies (cattle and mules, fat and salted butter, salted meats, cod, linens and canvas), but also to Le Havre and La Rochelle for wood and coal. Lawful or otherwise exchanges also took place with the Channel Islands (tanbark, grain and wool). Cherbourg shipowners were absent from significant fishing, including that of cod on the banks of Newfoundland, which was a specialty of Granville. 361 workers (1764) and 69 skilled workers (1778) of the factory annually produced (1760) 2,000 fine linens in green and white strip. Cherbourg also had seven producers of starch. Opened in 1793 at the location of the current Lawton-Collins Wharf, the arsenal was moved in 1803 on a decision by Napoleon, within the project of the military port. Sailing ships were built, the first, the brig La Colombe, was launched on 27 September 1797, and then screw-propelled vessels up to the end of the 19th century. From 1898, the Arsenal specialised in the construction of submarines. The first were Le Morse and Le Narval. Since then, more than 91 vessels have been built there.

L'Annuaire de la Manche [The Yearbook of Manche] in 1829 mentioned several slate quarries in the agglomeration whose product was sometimes exported to Le Havre, two printers, two soda refineries (properties of Mr. Le Couturier and Messrs. Crenier and Co. producing approximately 600 tonnes for Ostend, Dunkirk, Rouen and Paris, Germany and Russia), a sugar refinery (Mr. Despréaux) whose 50 tonnes were sold in the English Channel, a lace factory run by four nuns on behalf of Messrs. Blod and Lange and several tanners. It is indicated that the port trade was based on exportation of mules to Réunion and the Antilles, salted meat of pigs and eggs in Britain, wine and brandies, and the import of Scandinavian, Polish and Russian wood, linseed, and hemp. But its use as a place of war hampered the development of Cherbourg as major commercial port, compared to Le Havre. Ten years later, for these exchanges, Jean Fleury counted 225 to 230 both French and foreign, from 30 to 800 tons, ships each carrying 6 to 18 crew. He added the maritime buildings and armaments and the export of butter of La Hague, and the total annual trade was estimated at between 4 or 5 million francs, of which one million for the export of eggs to the United Kingdom, and 850 tons of salted meat.

At the beginning of the 20th century, Cherbourg was primarily a military port. The commercial port was modest, always exporting mules to the West Indies and Réunion and local food products to Britain (butter, meats, eggs, cattle, etc.), but also chemical products of soda extracted from kelp, granite from nearby quarries, and important wood and iron from Nord, tar, hemp, and food from the colonies. At this time the port embraced the transatlantic epic. Cherbourg's industry was then specialised in shipbuilding, as well as in lace-making and the manufacture of rope. The late 19th century also saw Cherbourg develop an aviation industry, through the company of Félix du Temple, taken over in 1938 by Félix Amiot, another aviation pioneer for the aerospace company of Normandy. Gradually, workers developed a particular skill in metalwork, both for the submarines of the Arsenal, for aircraft and ships of the Amiot shipyards or Babcock-Wilcox boilers.

In 1916, Nestlé introduced its first French factory in Cherbourg.

The 1960s saw a revival of the local economy through the increase in the female workforce and the decline of agricultural employment in favour of diversification of jobs and a high-tech industry. In 1960, under the leadership of Mayor Jacques Hébert, Hortson was established in the Maupas quarter. One hundred employees manufactured projectors and film cameras, particularly for the ORTF and Russian television. Redeemed, the factory specialised under the name of Thomson-CSF audiovisual in surveillance and medical cameras, then in the production of electronic circuits of computer terminals on behalf of Constructions Mécaniques de Normandie and the Arsenal. Since 1976, it has been dedicated to the production of microwave electronic devices, employing 260 workers in 1979 contracted for radars of the Mirage F1 Army Air and of the Navy Super Etendards, rising to 400 employees at the end of the 1980s, after moving in 1987 into a new modernised factory in Tourlaville. For a decade, the electronic workshop expanded, adding a production line for mobile television relays, and a workshop for mechanical surface treatment. As part of the internal restructuring of Alcatel, the site, which has 300 employees, was sold in 2002 to Sanmina-SCI, which ceased its activity in March 2008. The Compagnie industrielle des télécommunications (CIT), merged the following decade with Alcatel, it also opened an assembly plant for electronic telephone exchanges, at Querqueville in the 1960s. The unit, seen as a flagship of French industry by the new president of the Republic in 1981, was considered unnecessary after the integration of Thomson's telephony division with Alcatel in 1984 and suffered heavy redundancies from the end of the 1980s, before closing in 1997 at the end of a difficult social conflict.

Between the 1970s and 1990s, the two major projects of northern Cotentin, the La Hague reprocessing plant and the Flamanville Nuclear Power Plant, accentuated the industrial development of a city that saw a golden age through what the journalist François Simon called "industries of death", since about two thirds of the local industrial fabric was related to defence and the nuclear industry.

Cherbourg is also the cradle of the Halley family and society, which became Promodès in the 1960s (Continent hypermarkets, Champion supermarkets). In 1999, Promodès merged with Carrefour. The old buildings of Halley House became the technical centre of the Cachin vocational school, on Avenue Aristide-Briand.

=== Economic data ===
In 1999, the economically active population of Cherbourg and Octeville was 18,671 inhabitants in a total population of 42,288 inhabitants.

Cherbourg-Octeville supports an unemployment rate (19.6% in 1999), double that of its job base (9.3% in 2006, a decrease of 1.1% in one year) which itself has the highest unemployment of the basins of employment of the department. At 31 December 2004, there were 3,700 jobseekers. Therefore, the annual average household income is lower than the national average (€13,730 for the city, compared with €15,027 in France) despite an average monthly salary (€1,590 in 2001) highest job growth of the department and higher than that of Caen-Bayeux (€1,550).

Qualification of employment
Number of jobs (%)	Employment pool	Manche	Lower Normandy
Farm workers	5	7.2	5.1
Artisans, merchants and entrepreneurs	6	7.2	6.9
Executives and professionals	8.1	6.5	7.8
Associate professionals	25.2	19.2	19.5
Employees	29	28.8	29.2
Manual workers	26.7	31.1	31.5

=== Main activities ===
Cherbourg is the seat of the Chamber of Commerce and Industry of Cherbourg-Cotentin particularly manages the airport, the fishing ports of Cherbourg and the trade, and, together with the Chamber of Commerce and Industry of Centre and Sud-Manche, the FIM group training organisation.

- Major Employers on 1 January 2001

Name	Activity	Staff
DCNS	Naval construction	3,190
Centre hospitalier Louis-Pasteur	Healthcare/social	1,411
EDF	Electricity production	625
Ville de Cherbourg-Octeville	Public administration	606
ACAIS (Association Cherbourg action sanitaire/sociale)	Healthcare/social	531
CMN	Naval construction	522
CUC	Public administration	458
Auchan	Retail group	426
Sanmina (ex-Alcatel)	Electronics manufacturing	364
Euriware	IT services	291
Lycée A. de Tocqueville	Secondary education	275
Centre communal d’action sociale	Healthcare/social	264

- Maritime sector

The Cherbourg economy derives a large part of its activities from its maritime position. Cherbourg indeed has four ports: A military port, a fishing port, a port of commerce (passenger traffic and cross-border goods) and a marina.

Weakened since the 1990s, the commercial port sees the transit of 110,000 trucks to or from Ireland and Great Britain. Project Fastship, involving container transport from Philadelphia (United States) by high-speed vessels and oped for fifteen years, has been forgotten in favour of the Motorways of the Sea in the context of the Ena (Eurocoast Network Association), with Cuxhaven (Germany), Ostend (Belgium), Rosslare (Ireland) and Ferrol (Spain), with no more effect at the moment.

In recent years, the cross-Channel passenger traffic has declined, with competition from Caen-Ouistreham and the Pas-de-Calais. The withdrawal of the P&O company, which served Poole and Southampton, has left two companies with cross-Channel links: Brittany Ferries to Portsmouth and Poole and Irish Ferries to Rosslare (Ireland). In the first eleven months of 2007 compared with the same period of 2006, passenger traffic declined by 3.84% to 750,000 units, while freight fell 4.43% with 87,000 trucks landed. For comparison, the port had 1.7 million passengers and 138,000 trucks in 1995.

Property, with the Port of Caen-Ouistreham, of the joint association Ports Norman Associates, involving the Regional Council of Lower Normandy and the Departmental Councils of Manche and Calvados, port trade is managed by a joint company of the Chamber of commerce and Louis Dreyfus Armateurs. The construction of a terminal dedicated to the traffic of coal from South America and destined for the United Kingdom will put an end to the haemorrhage of the activity of the port.

The fishing industry is affected by the crisis affecting the entire industry, and the port has seen its fleet decline.

Cherbourg was the first French marina by number of visitors in 2007, having 10,117 boats for 28,713 overnight stays in 2007, and the total impact estimated at €4 million for the Cherbourg agglomeration.

A tradition of local industry, shipbuilding is based on the two pillars of the DCNS Cherbourg for submarines and Constructions Mécaniques de Normandie (CMN), famous for their speedboats. This sector has been widely restructured over the past twenty years. The military arsenal saw the end of the construction of the Redoutable-class submarines and expanded its customer base, until then exclusively of the Navy, prior to being privatised in 2007. With diesel Agosta submarines, developed since 1994 for Pakistan, and the Scorpène, in collaboration with the shipyards of Cartagena, sold to Malaysia, Chile and India, 25% of the total turnover of the establishment is of foreign origin. Partnerships with Pakistan and India have concluded to make the construction term at home. The CMN, which employed 1,200 people at the beginning of the 1980s, modernised and automated, and now has 500 employees. The company diversified into large luxury yachts, without abandoning the military market, and has signed such contracts with the United Arab Emirates and Qatar through the Franco-Lebanese businessman Iskandar Safa, owner since 1992.

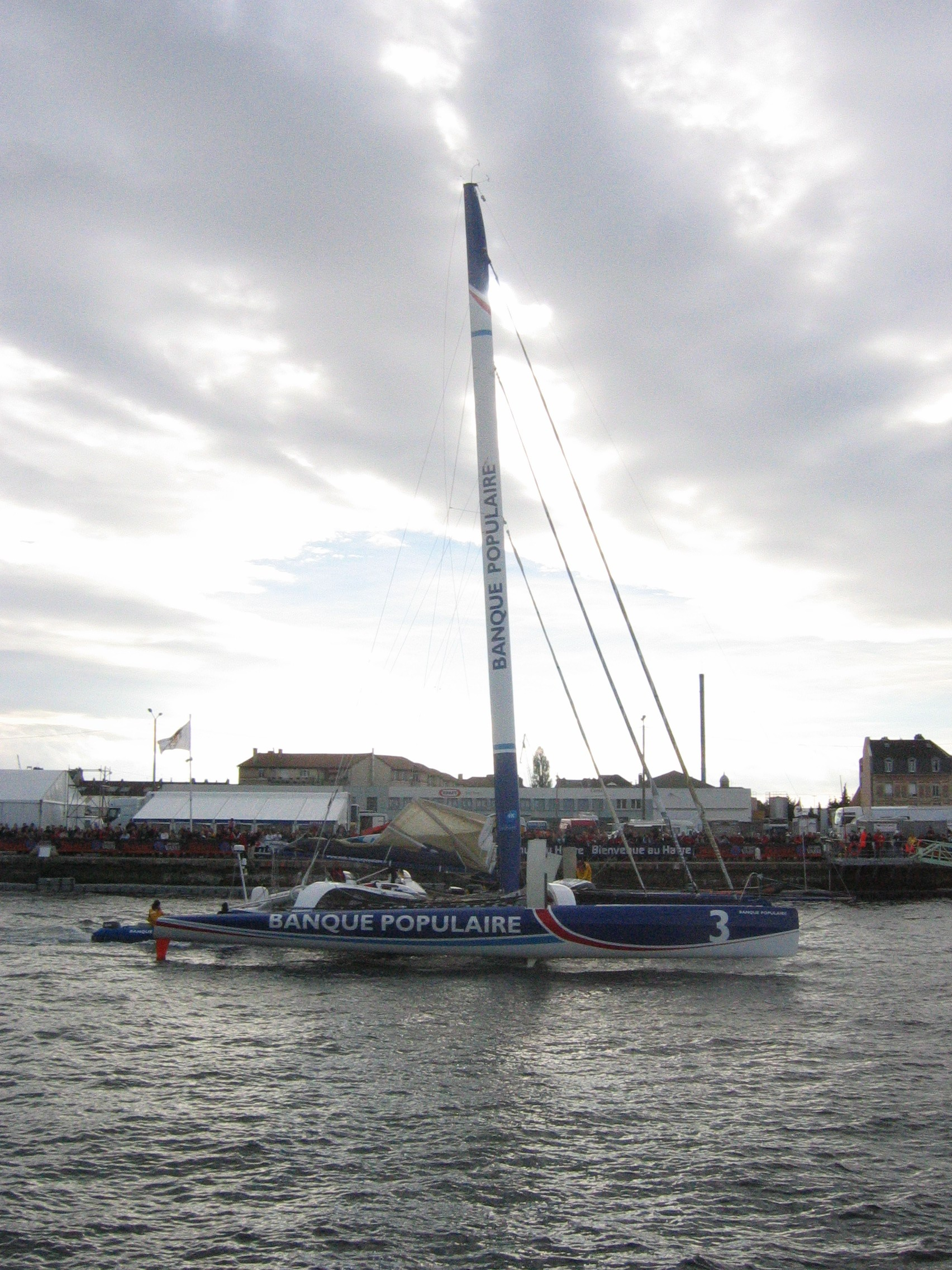
Multihull Banque Populaire, built by the JMV Industries shipyard

While these two military companies have experienced reductions in loads (the number of jobs at the Arsenal increased from 6,000 including 1,000 subcontracted, in 1988, to 2,600 including 500 subcontractors), and the companies have repositioned in the nautical industry. JMV Industries, a subsidiary of CMN with 100 employees, built racing yachts. Originally hosted by CMN to build aluminium hulls designed by James Ébénistes (Saint-Laurent-de-Cuves), Allures Yachting has specialised in cruising sailboats. The Allais shipyard, of Dieppe, has established a subsidiary, ICAN, dedicated to civilian boats and pleasure craft.

A network of subcontractors and specialists formed around this hub through Ameris France (established in 1994 under the name of Cap 50 export, specialised in the research and the supply of spare parts for ships and military aircraft), the Efinor group (founded in 1988, specialising in metallurgy, nuclear decommissioning and engineering), MPH (help in project control, 140 employees). At Saint-Vaast-la-Hougue, Facnor has become a global specialist of sailing reels.

The Navy employs nearly 3,000 officials in the agglomeration, especially in the context of administration (maritime prefecture), maritime safety (customs, CROSS, Abeille), logistical support of the French Navy and foreign passage, and of training.

- Metallurgy

Metallurgy has long represented a large source of employment in the agglomeration. Around the Arsenal and its boilermakers, several metalworking and mechanical industries were formed from the early 1900s. This is the case of the oldest business the city, the Simon Brothers company, founded in 1856, which went from being a mechanical workshop to a steam agricultural machinery manufacturer and then to an agribusiness in a half a century.

Manufacturing guns in 1870 and 1939, the company became a world leader in churns and mixers for the butter industry. Similarly, the Babcock boiler manufacturer was implanted in Cherbourg in the interwar period and closed its doors after a protracted labour dispute, in 1979. Later, the UIE began business in Cherbourg in 1973, for the construction of oil platforms, but closed in 1985.

- Agri-food

The food industry, essential in Lower Normandy, is not absent from the employment pool. A farm raising salmon in the harbour, abattoirs handling farmed livestock of Nord-Cotentin, and several processing companies exist. The Simon Brothers (50 employees) have supplied equipment for the cider and dairy industries for more than a century.

- Electronics

Alcatel had two units in the 1980s, one in Cherbourg, then Tourlaville (formerly Thomson-CSF) the other in Querqueville (Alcatel CIT). Both, regarded as flagships of the group, specialised respectively in microwave and electronic telephone exchanges. However, Alcatel decided to close the Querqueville factory in 1997, Codifur then took over part of the business with hundreds of employees. In 2002, it also offloaded the Tourlaville unit to Sanmina-SCI, which relocated its production six years later. Codifur resumed the after-sales service business of Alcatel, or 5% of the initial activity, and a few dozen employees.

- Other industries

Socoval, a manufacturer of menswear of the Cantoni Group from Italy, is the last textile factory of the Cotentin and employs about 100 employees, since the social plan of 2001, which resulted in the loss of about 40 employees.

Economic partners now rely on the "mastery of atmosphere", i.e. the control of contamination from industrial processes, through the Cherbourg-Normandy technopole created in 2001. Having experience of work involving nuclear risk, it wants to transfer these skills to the food, electronics and pharmaceutical industries. Two courses have been designed for this purpose: A BTS in nuclear maintenance at the Lycee Tocqueville and a DESS in mastery of atmosphere at the Cherbourg School of Engineering.

- Commerce

The urban community, the main commercial centre of the Cotentin, has four hypermarkets covering 26,780 m^{2} (288,300 sq ft) - of which one, Carrefour (260 employees), located in the Cherbourg area, represents the third largest private employer of the commune - as well as several large specialist stores. Trade employs nearly 1,400 people in the city centre, but the decline in cross-Channel traffic has caused a big shortfall, exacerbated by the fragile local economy. Although downtown Cherbourg is the main commercial centre of the agglomeration, with 340 establishments, its dominance is lower in the urban community, when compared to Caen towards its agglomeration. Indeed, Cherbourg focuses 35% of commercial activities and 45% of retail trade in the agglomeration, against 40% and 55% for the centre of Caen respectively, particularly two-thirds of the human equipment stores against 90% in Lower Normandy's capital. Grocery chains, equipment and home appliances have left the city centre for out-of-town shopping centres. The number of fast food outlets doubled between 1995 and 2005, while the strength of the traditional catering has stagnated.

- Services

Cherbourg-Octeville, the largest city of the department, is the main centre for administration and services for the Cotentin. Health is an important provider of jobs with the Pasteur hospital (470 beds, second of Lower Normandy, merged since 2006 with the Hospital of Valognes) and the Cotentin Polyclinic. The same goes for the education sector with four public and four private schools, a marine high school and aquaculture, a university campus and several graduate schools. The branches of public enterprises are also located there (EDF, with 120 officers and SNCF, with 50 officers). Public employment represents an important part with, in addition to the hospital and schools, municipal and community staff.

Business service companies are also present in computer science (Euriware, 85 employees), cleanliness (Onet, 240 employees, and Sin&Stes, 100 employees) and advertising (Adrexo, 50 employees).

Cherbourg-Octeville hosts the headquarters of France Bleu Cotentin public radio, and the departmental daily La Presse de la Manche (120 employees with his CES press), successor to the Libération de Cherbourg-Éclair, and subsidiary of the Groupe SIPA - Ouest-France since 1990. France 3 Normandie boasts a local editorial office in the city; Cherbourg's edition of La Manche libre covers the agglomeration, La Hague and the Val de Saire; local television 5050 TV has installed its headquarters and its main studio in the area.

Jobs in the construction sector are divided between Faucillion (80 employees), Eiffage (75 employees) and Colas (60 employees).

Since its opening, the Cité de la Mer is the tourist engine of Nord-Cotentin. The cruise terminal also attracts liners each year. The marina of 1,500 spaces is the first French port of call (11,000 per year). The capacity of the city was, as of 1 January 2007, 15 hotels and 429 rooms. The casino, owned by the Cogit Group is the 109th in France, with a turnover of €6.7 million.

== Politics and administration ==
In 2010, the commune of Cherbourg-Octeville was awarded a 3-star equivalent "Ville Internet" label and was upgraded to a 4-star equivalent rating in 2012.

=== Administrative divisions ===
The city has the central office of two cantons: Canton of Cherbourg-Octeville-1 (to the west) and Cherbourg-Octeville-2 (in the east, which also includes the town of La Glacerie). Departmental advisors are the Socialists Frédéric Bastian, Anna Pic, Karine Duval and Sébastien Fagnen.

The arrondissement of Cherbourg has 189 municipalities and 190,363 inhabitants. The sub-prefect is Jacques Troncy, former sub-prefect of Montbéliard, appointed 17 March 2014.

Since 1986, the fifth constituency of Manche, known as Cherbourg, covered the three cantons of Cherbourg-Octeville, and those of Equeurdreville-Hainneville, Saint-Pierre-Église and Tourlaville. In the context of the legislative redistricting of 2010, the two cantons of Beaumont-Hague and Quettehou integrated the constituency of Cherbourg-Octeville, becoming the 4th constituency. Despite this redistribution often perceived as advantageous for the right, the outgoing Socialist deputy of the 5th constituency, Bernard Cazeneuve, was re-elected in the first round with 55% of the vote.

Cherbourg-Octeville also has the headquarters of the maritime prefecture of the English Channel and the North Sea, whose authority extends from the Bay of Mont Saint-Michel to the Belgian border. The maritime prefect is the Vice Admiral of the Squadron, Bruno Nielly. The maritime quarter of Cherbourg (initials: CH) is restricted to the limits of the department.

Since 1971, Cherbourg-Octeville has belonged to the Urban community of Cherbourg, presided over by André Rouxel since 2012, Mayor of Tourlaville, to which the municipality delegates urban transport, management of space and the quality of life, the environment and development strategies (higher education, research, major projects, and Cité de la Mer, etc.).

The postal codes from prior to the merger of 2000 have been preserved: 50130 for addresses of the former territory of Octeville, 50100 for Cherbourg.

=== Political trends and results ===
Cherbourg is historically, with the Arsenal and the port, the main focus of labour and trades unions of the department of Manche. However, the Cherbourg workers do not lean towards radical or revolutionary movements, nor to yellow unionism, traditionally preferring the reformist tendencies. These choices are reflected politically into a strong center-left anchor, dominated by Socialist-radicals and independent Socialists, before whom the SFIO and the Socialist Party are not imposed. Since the Liberation, with the exception of a Gaullist period of 18 years with Jacques Hébert following René Schmitt's death, the city of Cherbourg has voted in favour Socialist forces.

Similarly, the right won the town hall of Octeville in 1989, for a term, by the division of the left. Since the redrawing of the electoral district of Cherbourg in 1986, covering the urban population of the agglomeration and the rural district of the Canton of Saint-Pierre-Église, the left-right alternation is the rule in every legislative election.

Presidential elections, results of the second rounds

- Election of 2012 (77.28% participation): 60.00% for François Hollande (PS, elected), 40.00% for Nicolas Sarkozy (UMP).
- Election of 2007 (83.27% participation): 52.03% for Ségolène Royal (PS), 47.97% for Nicolas Sarkozy (UMP, elected).
- Election of 2002 (76.82% participation): 86,81% for Jacques Chirac (RPR, elected), 13.19% for Jean-Marie Le Pen (FN).

Parliamentary elections, results of the second rounds (1 round, unique for 2012)

- Elections of 2012 (54.48% participation), candidates who have collected more than 5% of the vote: 56.57% to Bernard Cazeneuve (PS, elected), 39.23% David Margueritte (UMP), 8.80% for Jean-Jacques Christmas (FN), 5.55% for Ralph Lejamtel (EELV).
- Elections of 2007 (61.28% participation): 60.77% for Bernard Cazeneuve (PS, elected), 39.23% Jean Lemière (UMP).
- Elections of 2002 (62.49% participation): 50.78% for Bernard Cazeneuve (PS), 49.22% for Jean Lemière (UMP, elected).

European elections, results of the two scores or more than 15%

- 2014 election (41.70% participation): 20.59% for Jérôme Lavrilleux (UMP), 20.38% for Gilles Pargneaux (PS-PRG), 19.85% for Marine Le Pen (FN).
- 2009 election (37.63% participation): 24.98% for Dominique Riquet (UMP), 22.51% for Gilles Pargneaux (PS), 14.2% for Hélène Flautre (Europe Écologie).
- 2004 election (40.81% participation): 37.75% for Henri Weber (PS), 16.74% for Tokia Saïfi (UMP).
- 1999 election (45.52% participation): Cherbourg, 25.12% for François Hollande (PS), 13.98% to Charles Pasqua (RPF), 12.54% for Nicolas Sarkozy, 45.09% of participation; Octeville 29.79% for François Hollande (PS), 11.55% for Charles Pasqua (FPN), 8.08% for Nicolas Sarkozy.

Regional elections

- 2004 election (61.90% participation): 58,27% for Philippe Duron (PS), 31.06% for René Garrec (UMP), 10.67% for Fernand Le Rachinel (FN).
- 1998 election (53.71% participation): Cherbourg 42.06% for Jean-Pierre Godefroy (PS), 18.13% for Pierre Aguiton (UDF), 51.08% participation. Octeville 44.33% for Jean-Pierre Godefroy (PS), 15.50% for Pierre Aguiton (UDF).

Cantonal elections

- 2008 election: Canton of Cherbourg-Octeville-Sud-Ouest 54.43% for Michel Lerenard (PS), 15.37% for Alain Estève (DVD), 53.22% of participation; Canton of Cherbourg-Octeville-Nord-Ouest 63.03% for Jean-Michel Houllegatte (PS), 36.97% for Jean Lemière, 39.32% participation
- 2004 election: Canton of Cherbourg-Octeville-Sud-Est, 65.69% for Michel Louiset (PS), 34.31% for M Héry, 59.04% participation.
- 2001 election: Canton of Cherbourg-Nord-Ouest (2nd round), 56.15% for Jean Lemière, 43.85% for Jean-Michel Houllegatte, 52.35% of participation; Canton of Cherbourg-Octeville-Sud-Ouest (1st round), 53.12% for Michel Lerenard, 25.29% for Guillemeau, 52.28% participation.
- 1998 election: Canton of Cherbourg-Sud-Est, 65.76% for Michel Louiset, 34.24 percent Ponthou, 41.5% participation.

Municipal elections

- 2014 election: 39.19% for Jean-Michel Houllegatte (PS), 34.06% for David Margueritte (UMP), 15.56% for Jean Levallois (DVD), 11.17% for Ralph Lejamtel (FG), 52.28% participation.
- 2008 election: 66.82% for Bernard Cazeneuve (PS), 19.64% for Jean Lemière (UMP), 13.55% for Hervé Corbin (dissident UMP), 55.48% of participation.
- 2001 election: 55.09% for Bernard Cazeneuve, 23.98% for Jean Lemière, 55.57% participation.

Referendums

- 2005 European Constitution referendum: 43.39% for Yes, 56.61% for No, 68.95% participation.
- Local referendum on the Grand Cherbourg: Cherbourg 83.72% for Yes; Octeville 55.88% for Yes.

=== List of mayors ===
With the merging of the municipal councils of Cherbourg and Octeville on 1 March 2000, Jean-Pierre Godefroy (PS), the Mayor of Cherbourg, took the helm of the new administration, and Bernard Cazeneuve (PS), Mayor of Octeville, became the first Deputy. Bernard Cazeneuve was elected Mayor of Cherbourg-Octeville during the 2001 municipal election, and re-elected in March 2008 with 66.82% of the vote. Appointed Minister Delegate for European Affairs in May 2012, he gave way to Jean-Michel Houllegatte the following month. The latter was re-elected following the victory of his list with 51.81% at the second round of the 2014 municipal election.

List of mayors of Cherbourg-Octeville
Start	End	Name	Party	Other details
March 2000	March 2001	Jean-Pierre Godefroy	PS	Technician
March 2001	23 June 2012	Bernard Cazeneuve	PS	Lawyer
23 June 2012	In progress	Jean-Michel Houllegatte	PS	Territorial official

=== Municipal administration ===
The municipal council is composed of 39 members including the mayor and eleven assistants. Thirty Councillors represent a leftist majority, nine represent the opposition.

=== Budget ===
The main initial budget for 2007 amounted to €73,994,364, divided between the operating section (€54,126,712) and investment section (€19,867,652). Personnel expenses exceeded half (60%) of operating expenses. Almost all of the resources were fuelled by grants (49%) and tax (44%). Of the seven budgets of the municipal mandate (2001-2007), this budget increased overall by 22% (43% for investments, 15% for operation).

The investment budget is included in the multiannual programme "Unite the city" (2003-2007), presented in December 2002 by Bernard Cazeneuve. It sees a transformation of the newly amalgamated city through refurbishment of the pool and Port Chantereyne, development of the Bassins zone, filling the retaining channel, and the construction of the sailing school. It is mainly financed by borrowing, increasing the debt of the city (the charges multiplied by two-thirds between 2002 and 2007), lower than the average per capita of the stratum.

=== International relations ===
Cherbourg is twinned with:

- Poole, United Kingdom, since 1977
- Bremerhaven, Germany
- Deva, Romania
- La Somone, Senegal, since 2013

Cherbourg maintains decentralised co-operation with:

- Sarh, Chad, since 2001
- Coubalan, Senegal, since 1995
- Veles, North Macedonia

Twinning projects:

- Hann, Senegal, a quarter of Dakar
- La Unión, Honduras
- Kalaat M'Gouna, Morocco

=== Justice ===
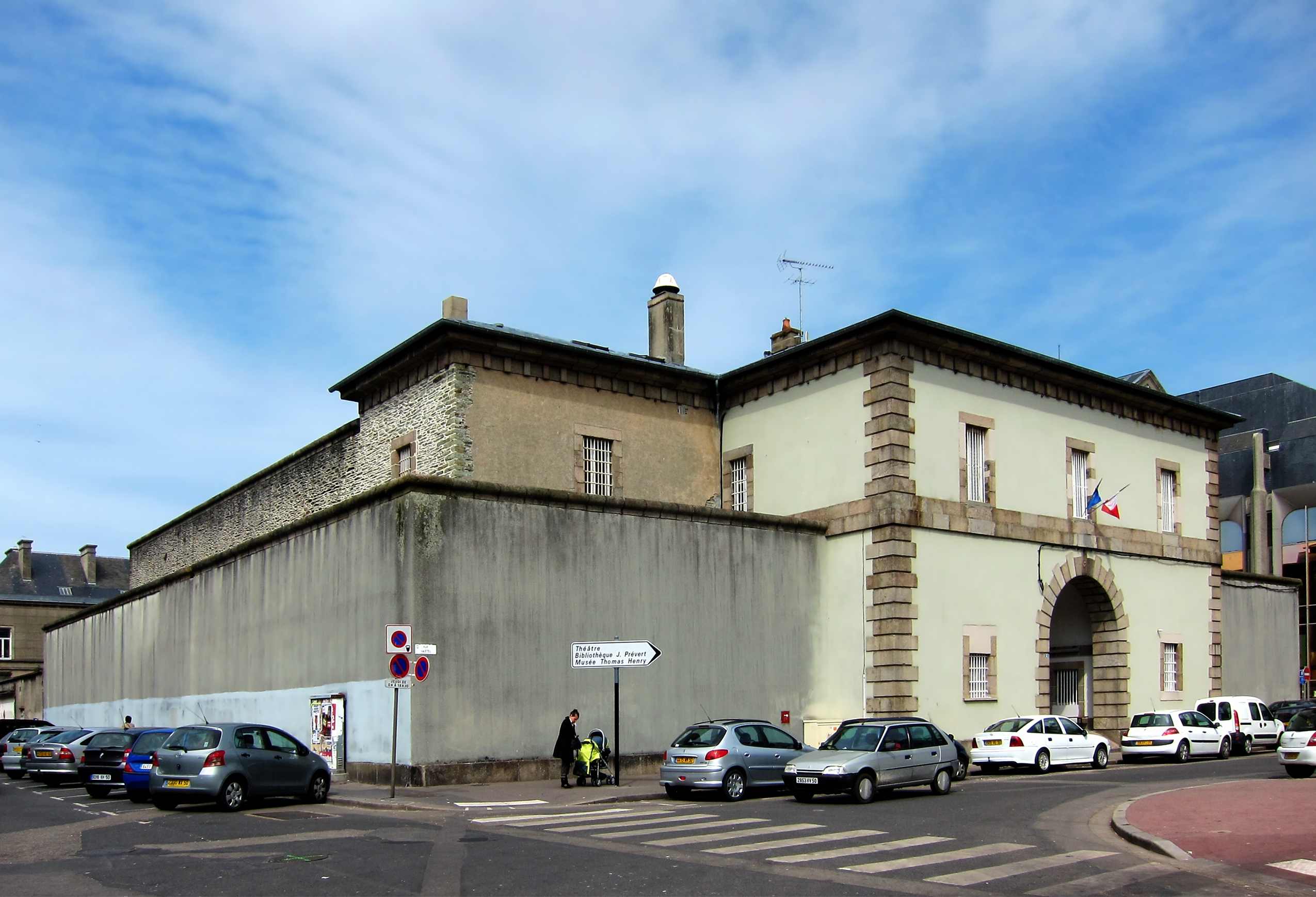
The remand prison of Cherbourg.

Louis XVI removed the viscountcy of Cherbourg by edict in November 1771, and transferred the rights of justice to the Bailiwick of Valognes. In 1785, a sub-delegation was created, however it was smaller than the Viscountcy, essentially covering La Hague, as far as Héauville and included Helleville, Tourlaville, and Bretteville, Digosville and Martinvast, and always under the authority of the electoral district of Valognes.

Cherbourg became a town and district in January 1790, seat of a justice of the peace and a civil and criminal court. Under the Directory, they were replaced by a simple police court, attended by a justice of the peace, and a police correctional court. The correctional court closed after the Act of 17 February 1800 and Cherbourg was made a town and township of the Arrondissement of Valognes. After his arrival in the city, Napoleon established a Court of first instance by the Decree of 19 July 1811.

The city is today one of the three main judicial hubs of Manche, along with Coutances and Avranches. It hosts a high court (arrondissement of Cherbourg-Octeville), a court (Canton of Beaumont-Hague, Cherbourg-Octeville-Nord-Ouest, Cherbourg-Octeville-Sud-Est, Équeurdreville-Hainneville, Cherbourg-Octeville-Sud-Ouest, Les Pieux, Saint-Pierre-Eglise and Tourlaville), a council of tribunals and a tribunal of commerce. A remand prison is located in the city centre, behind the buildings of the court. As a result of the justice reform presented in 2007 by Rachida Dati, the jurisdiction of the Court of Valognes will be integrated to that of Cherbourg.

== Local life ==
=== Education ===
Year 2010-2011	Students
School of Quartermasters	768
IUT Cherbourg-Manche	573
BTS and various preparation	349
School of Engineering (Esix)	270
Institute of Nursing	215
Licences and university diplomas	191
Intechmer	153
School of Fine Arts of Cherbourg-Octeville	46
EAMEA	39
ECD – School of Trade and Distribution	22
National Institute of science and nuclear technology	8
Total	2634

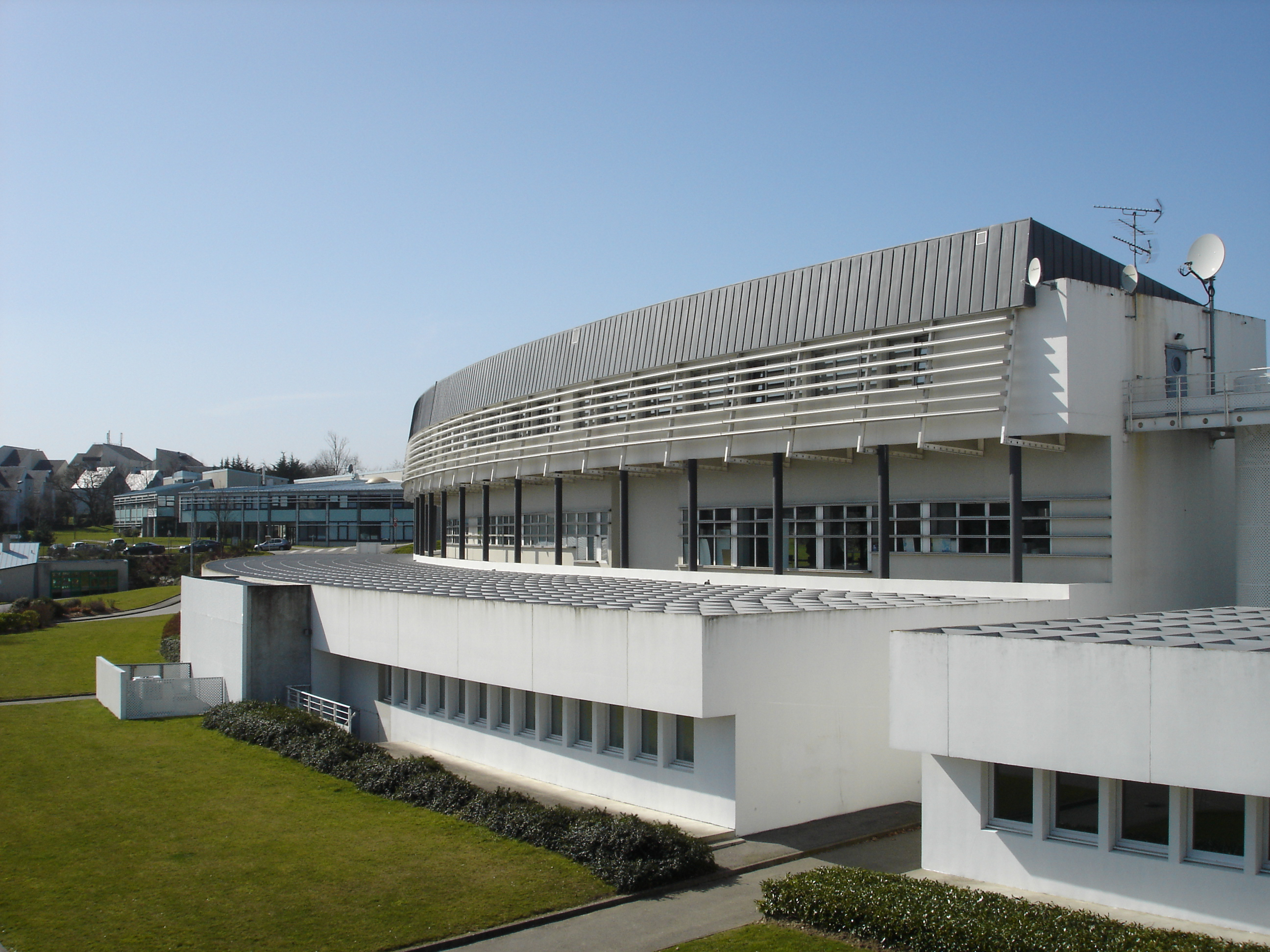
The Engineering School of Cherbourg, on the main university campus.

Two ZEP have been defined, one being on Cherbourg territory in the Quarter of Maupas, the other straddling Cherbourg and Octeville, in the quarter of the Provinces.

Cherbourg-Octeville has six high schools:

- The former college, which became high school in 1886, is known by the name of Lycée Victor Grignard (830 students: General and TSG, as well as scientific preparatory classes).
- The Lycée Jean-François Millet (1,210 students: General sector, preparatory health, preparatory literary classes).
- The Lycée Alexis de Tocqueville (1,480 students: General sector, technical, professional and higher education -BTS-).
- The Ingénieur-Cachin private professional high school (320 students).
- The Thomas Hélye private high school, the Sainte-Chantal private lycée and the La Bucaille technological lycée (1,005 students, courses) general and technical.
- The aquaculture and marine high school (102 pupils). On 28 June 2013, this became the professional maritime and aquaculture lycée Daniel Rigolet.

The university campus, installed on the heights of Octeville, focuses the Cherbourg School of Engineering, the IUT Cherbourg-Manche (which hosts approximately 1,000 students in initial or continuing education through four DUT departments, four pro licenses, one DU, a DCEF and a DAEU), as well as two branches of the University of Caen (UFR sciences and UFR modern foreign languages). The Pasteur hospital houses the Institute of training in nursing of Cherbourg-Octeville. The Group FIM, training service of the two chambers of commerce and industry of la Mancha, manages the school of trade and distribution, and since 2007, the Institute of promotion and marketing boating, forming alternating a fortnight of accreditation in the field of boating (shipbuilding, nautical services company, marinas, etc.).

The Institute of the Film Industry of Normandy is installed as a result of the International School of Audiovisual Creation and Realisation (EICAR) on the site of the former maritime hospital. It is complemented by the training of apprentices of the Performing Arts and Audiovisual Centre, while the School of Fine Arts (Esbaco), founded in 1912 by Henri Buffet design Professor and Professor of modelling Félix Delteil, is located in the former convent of the Little Sisters of the Poor (Bassins zone) since 1976.

Cherbourg-Octeville welcomes the School of the Military Applications of Atomic Energy (EAMEA, 351 students) and the National Institute of Science and Nuclear Technology - remains of the importance of the army in the city - while the School of the Quartermasters (between 600 and 700 students) is located at Querqueville.

The town also hosts the National Institute of Science and Technology of the Sea (Intechmer), Tourlaville.

=== Sport ===
The first horse race organised in Normandy took place in Cherbourg in September 1836 on the (now gone) beachfront along the boulevard maritime, at the initiative of Éphrem Houël, the officer of the stud. The races settled in 1931 on the Lande Saint-Gabriel Racecourse in Tourlaville, the work of René Levavasseur, and the Hippodrome de La Glacerie from 1990.

In football, AS Cherbourg Football, after decades at the national level, is changing, as a result of bad sports results and financial problems, since 2014 in the Ligue de Basse-Normandie de football, equivalent to the 6th division, and is based at the Maurice-Postaire stadium. The club has also two other senior male teams in the League of Lower Normandy.

Three other clubs have teams in district divisions:

- The Patronage laïque d'Octeville [Secular Patronage of Octeville] (three teams)
- The Association sportive de l'Arsenal maritime de Cherbourg [Sporting Association of the Marine Arsenal of Cherbourg] (one team)
- Gazélec Football Club (two teams)

The Association sportive Amont-Quentin, which had two district teams until June 2013, had to cease its activities. The Octeville Hague Sport, which was developing its teams in 2013–2014, was unable to present any team for the 2014–2015 season.

In cycling, Cherbourg has been a city of arrival for the Tour de France on sixteen occasions: 1911 to 1914 (four consecutive years), from 1919 to 1929 (eleven consecutive years), and finally in 1986. Cherbourg was a departure city in 1994. The second stage of the 2016 Tour de France finishes at Cherbourg.

Cherbourg regularly hosts stages of sailing competitions such as the Solitaire du Figaro, the Course de l'Europe, the Challenge Mondial Assistance, the Tour de France à la voile, and the Tall Ships' Race.

The Challenger La Manche is a professional tennis tournament ($50,000 plus accommodation) held annually in Cherbourg since 1994.

In ice hockey, NC'HOP (Nord Cotentin Hockey Plus, the Cherbourg Vikings) was based in the city. The team was the successor to CHOC (Cherbourg Hockey Club), who played in FFHG Division 1 until filing for bankruptcy in 1996. NC'HOP left the competition in 2010.

AS Cherbourg men's basketball team plays in National 2 and the women's team in the Prenational league.

The Jeunesse sportive de Cherbourg has a male handball team in Pro D2 and a women's team in Nationale 3 (agreement with Tourlaville). The club has also implemented a structured training programme for young people, from the 2009/2010 season, around a partnership with colleges of the city.

=== Health ===
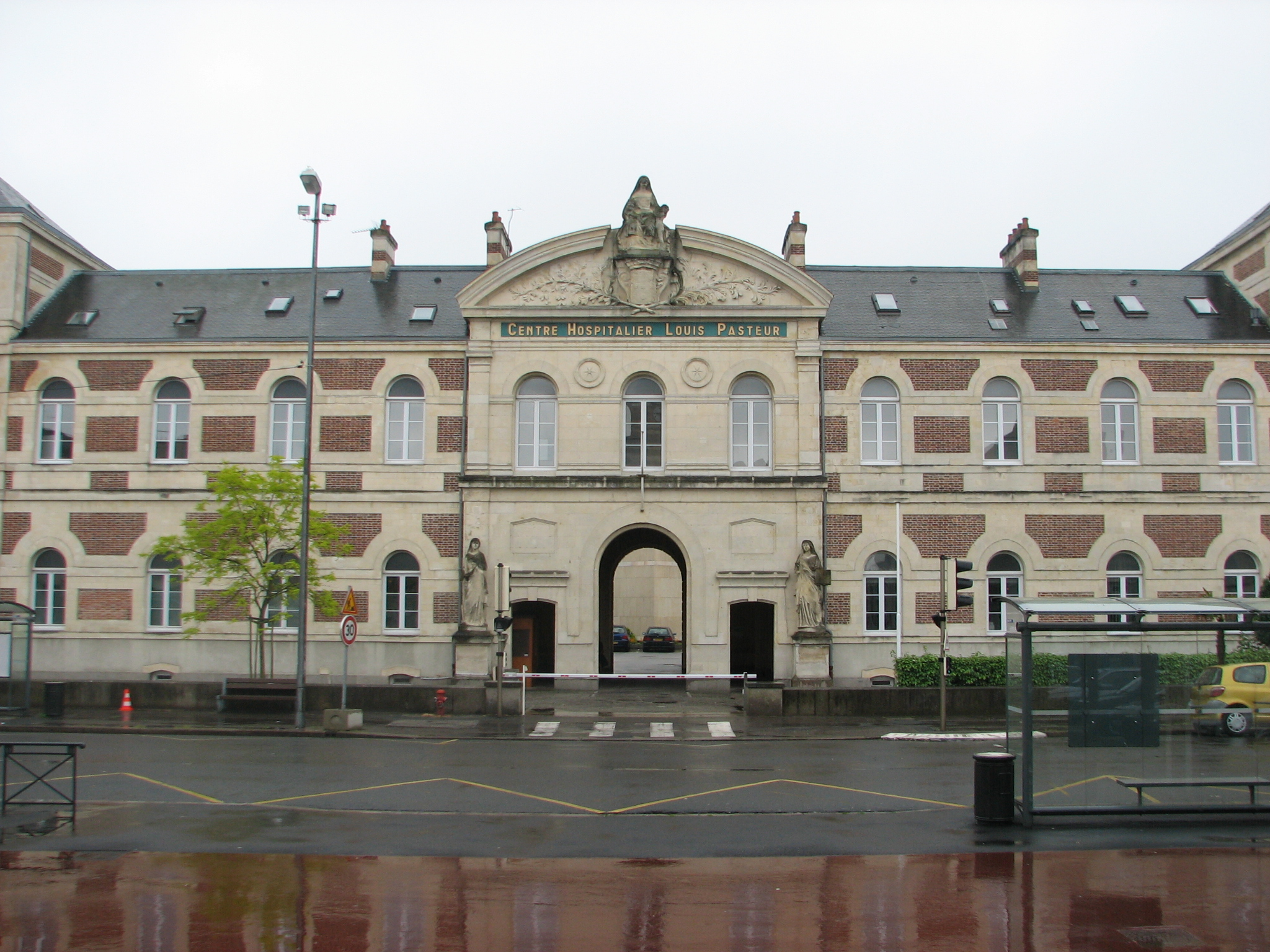
The main front of the Pasteur Hospital.

Cherbourg-Octeville has two hospitals:

- The Pasteur Central Hospital, public, second establishment of Lower Normandy with 711 beds and places. With a joint medical project since 2001 and a communal direction since 2003, the Pasteur Centre and the Central Hospital of Valognes merged in 2006 within the Centre hospitalier public du Cotentin (2,000 officials, more than 1,000 beds, and a 2005 budget of €133 million)
- The Polyclinic of the Cotentin, at the border between Octeville and Équeurdreville-Hainneville (102 beds).

The Gros Hêtre medicalised residence for elderly (a branch of the public hospital in the Cotentin) and, since 1999, the Jean-Brüder Community Health Centre are located on the territory of Octeville.

In 1859, following the Imperial visit, the State decided upon the construction of a Maritime Hospital of a thousand beds to accommodate the troops in garrison. Opened on 15 February 1869, it was renamed René-Le-Bas, named after the first doctor who joined the Free Naval Forces and died in 1942 aboard the submarine Surcouf. It was closed in 2002 and renovated as a university campus.

=== Religion ===
Attached to the Diocese of Coutances-Avranches, until 1 September 2009 the deanery of Cherbourg covered the territory of the urban community and the bordering communes of Tonneville, Urville-Nacqueville, and those of the former Communauté de communes de la Saire, and the Communauté de communes de Douve et Divette. To this date, it is merged to the deanery of La Hague, to become the Deanery of Cherbourg-Hague, therefore adding the parishes covering the Community of communes of La Hague and of Les Pieux. Jean-XXIII parish unites Cherbourg and La Glacerie, with the Cherbourg churches of La Trinité (long only parish church), Notre-Dame-du-Roule, Notre-Dame-du-Vœu, St-Jean-des-Carrières and Saint-Clément. The parish of Saint-Sauveur of Octeville, which also covers Nouainville has three sites in the commune: Saint-Martin, the historic site, Saint-Pierre-Saint-Paul, at Provinces, and the Chapel of Saint-Barthélemy.

Protestants have a temple of the Reformed Church (since 1835, rebuilt after the war in 1964), and a Pentecostal Evangelical church affiliated with the Assemblies of God. The Evangelical Baptist Church has been present since 1985 in the agglomeration and is currently located in Tourlaville.

Cherbourg and Octeville experienced two major waves of immigration of Muslim population, the late 1950s and during the 1960s, after the construction of the neighbourhoods of Amont-Quentin, Provinces and Maupas, and then in the 1980s, with the major construction sites of the La Hague reprocessing site and the Flamanville Nuclear Power Plant. The Muslim community then opened three mosques (the Mosque of Omar in Octeville, the Mosque de la Gare, on the Avenue de Normandie, and then the Turkish mosque, on the Boulevard de l’Atlantique).

The Church of Jesus Christ of Latter-day Saints, Parish of Cherbourg, has its chapel on the Rue du Commerce.

== Personalities linked to the commune ==
=== Natives of Cherbourg ===
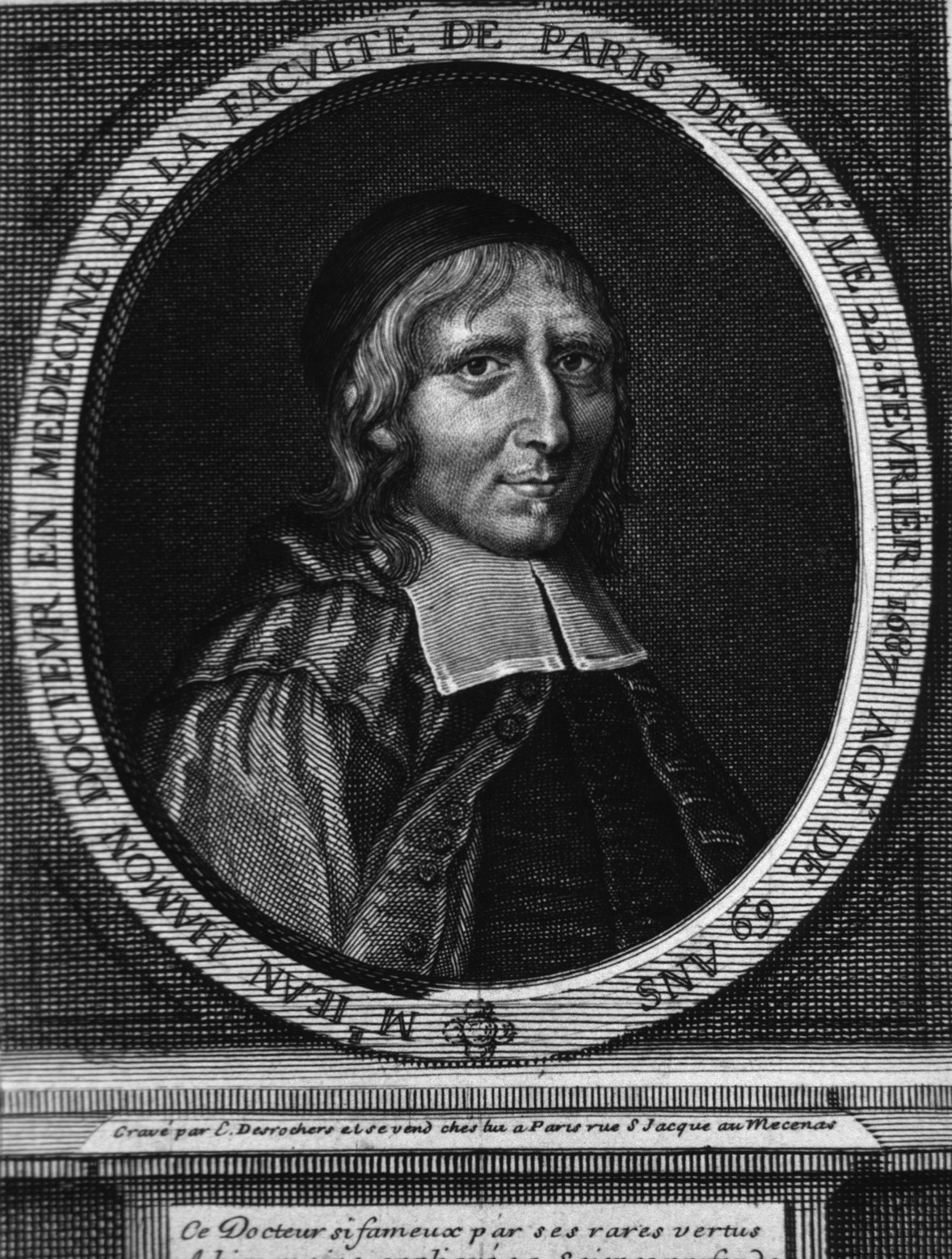
Jean Hamon.

- Masseot Abaquesne (c. 1500–1564), ceramicist
- Jean Nicolet (1598–1642), explorer of New France
- Philippe Mius d'Entremont (c. 1601 – c. 1700), Baron of Pobomcoup and coloniser
- Jean Hamon (1618–1687), medical doctor and solitaire of Port-Royal;
- Nicolas d'Orange des Roches (1626–1705), brigadier of the Armies of the King under Louis XIV, Governor of the Hôtel des Invalides
- Gilles Le Hédois, known as Du Bocage (b. 1658), French corsair then vice-admiral of Brazil
- Jean Baptiste de Beauvais (1731–1790), preacher and representative to the Estates General of 1789
- Louis Vastel, (1746–1819), lawyer at the Parlement of Rouen, and author of works of law
- Amable Troude (1762–1824), General of the Empire
- Pierre-Adrien de La Chapelle (1780–1854), botanist
- François Leconte (1791–1872), sailor
- Lizinska de Mirbel (1796–1849), miniaturist
- Alfred Charles Ernest Franquet de Franqueville (1809–1876), engineer
- Allyre Bureau (1810–1859), politician, musician
- Hippolyte Vallée (1816–1885), founder of the Fondation Vallée, for intellectually disabled children in Gentilly
- Joachim Menant (1820–1899), Assyriologist
- Emmanuel Liais (1826–1900), astronomer and mayor of Cherbourg
- Alfred-Alexandre Quentin (1827–1895), trombonist
- Alfred Rossel (1841–1926), songwriter in the Norman language
- Georges Sorel (1847–1922), political thinker
- Louise Rousseau (b. 1854), writer
- Henry Moret (1856–1913), painter of the Pont-Aven School
- Charles-Émile Bertin (1871–1959), colonel, eminent specialist in Meiji period Japan
- Victor Grignard (1871–1935), Nobel chemist laureate of the Nobel Prize in 1912
- Lortac (1884–1973), writer and French pioneer of animated cartoons
- Joseph Noyon (1888–1962), compositeur, arrangeur (Hymne à la nuit [Hymn to the night], Il est né le divin enfant [He is born the divine child])
- Louis-Amédée Lefèvre (1890–1968), Archbishop of Rabat
- Félix Amiot (1894–1974), aircraft builder and creator of Constructions Mécaniques de Normandie (CMN)
- Paul-Auguste Halley (1907–2002) and Paul-Louis Halley (1934-2003), founders of the Promodès Group
- Louis Gallien (1908–1976), biologist and zoologist
- André Defrance (1908–1952), member of the Resistance

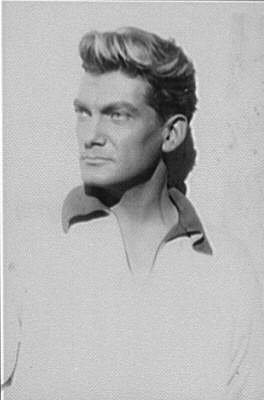
Jean Marais.

- Jean Marais (1913–1998), actor and stuntman
- Roland Barthes (1915–1980), semiologist
- Jean-Charles Tacchella (b. 1925), filmmaker, author of Cousin Cousine (1975);
- Maurice Séveno (b. 1925), journaliste, former television news presenter, and politician
- Annie Saumont (b. 1927), writer, laureate of the Prix Goncourt de la nouvelle in 1981
- Jacques Rouxel (1931–2004), animator, creator of Les Shadoks
- Michel Besnier (b 1945), writer
- Billy Bridge (1945–1994), singer who has imported the madison into France in the 1960s
- Patrick Thuillier (b. 1951), poet
- Daniel Lacotte (b 1951), writer
- Halvard Mabire (b 1956), sailor
- Élisabeth Ballet (b 1957), sculptor
- François Galgani (b 1958), oceanographer
- Joseph de Metz-Noblat (b 1959), Bishop of Langres
- Rosette (b 1959), film actress
- Olivier Thiébaut (b 1963), writer and illustrator
- Wilfried Gohel (b 1968), footballer
- Laurent Leflamand (b 1968), rugby player
- Françoiz Breut (b 1969), singer
- Julie Raynaud (b 1971), television presenter
- Émilie Loit (b 1979), tennis player
- Julie Quéré (b 1982), comedian
- Amaël Moinard (b 1982), cyclist
- Élodie Godin (b 1985), basketball player
- Lise de la Salle (b 1988), pianist
- Ernst Umhauer (b 1989), actor

=== Natives of Octeville ===
- Édouard Lebas (1897–1975), prefect and French politician.

=== Died in Cherbourg ===
- Jean-Baptiste Digard de Lousta (1803–1879), historian and poet.
- Prosper Payerne (1806–1886), physician, scientist and inventor.
- Armand Le Véel (1821–1905), statue sculptor.
- Alexandre Marie du Crest de Villeneuve (1813–1892), Rear Admiral.
- Jean-Charles-Alexandre Sallandrouze de Lamornaix (1840–1899), Admiral, Commander in Chief of the Squadron of the North, died in harbour on the battleship Formidable.
- Louis Corbière (1850–1941), botanist.
- Heinz Hellmich (1890 – 17 June 1944) German General who served in the Wehrmacht during World War II.
- Jean Simon (1912–2003), one of the negotiators of the Évian Accords for the abandonment of French Algeria
- Louis Darinot (1925–2006), politician, deputy mayor of Cherbourg

=== Others linked to Cherbourg ===
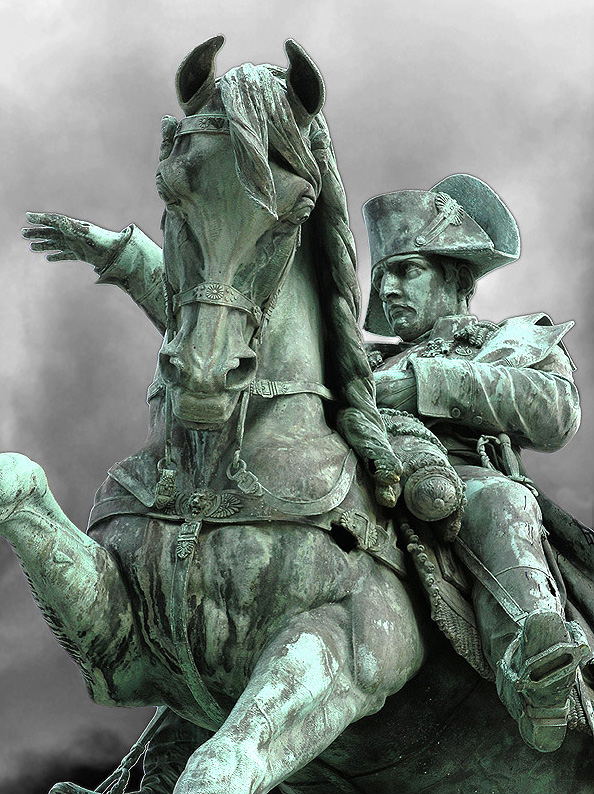
Statue of Napoleon at Cherbourg.

The work of the seawall and the military port in Cherbourg led many soldiers and engineers, for whom this step was often an important moment in their career. Thus, Charles François Dumouriez (1739–1823), Governor of Cherbourg who was responsible for the first work, at the dawn of the French Revolution, Joseph Cachin (1757–1825), engineer assigned by Napoleon to the general direction of the maritime work of Cherbourg in 1804. For twenty years, he realised the improvement of the commercial port, and the digging of the docks of the military port, constituting the New Arsenal. Henri Rieunier (1833–1918) who was twice major of the Navy in Cherbourg (1872/1875) and Louis-Émile Bertin (1840–1924) who lived in Cherbourg from 1863 to 1879, and is buried in the cemetery of La Glacerie. Charles-Eugène Delaunay (1816–1872), Director of the Paris Observatory, drowned while visiting the harbour. Among the engineers of the Directorate of construction and naval weapons, included Augustin-Louis Cauchy (1789–1857) and also Maxime Laubeuf. Under the Ancien Régime, the safeguarding of the Château de Cherbourg was already the task of illustrious figures of the Kingdom, such as Pierre des Essarts, the family of Matignon and Jacques de Callières (d. 1697). At the origin of the military port, Napoleon (1769–1821), who visited the city in 1811, "Revient" in Cherbourg in 1840 during the return of his remains to France, aboard Belle Poule, before being taken to Les Invalides.

A transatlantic port of the 20th century, Cherbourg saw Hollywood stars arrive, such as Charlie Chaplin, who organised his disembarkation in 1952 to a press conference in the gare maritime, critical of the McCarthyist America that he left. The port saw a lot of famous people, including businessman Benjamin Guggenheim (1865–1912) for his fatal voyage on the Titanic. Cinema then gave Cherbourg another lasting reputation, through the images of Jacques Demy (1931–1990) and music by Michel Legrand (1932-2019), in The Umbrellas of Cherbourg. Earlier, Frida Boccara (1940–1996), knew great success in 1961 with her song Cherbourg avait raison. The letters were not left with academician Georges Grente (1872–1959), superior of the Saint-Paul Institute, and Ernest Psichari (1883–1914), soldier and writer, whose garrison stay in Cherbourg in 1914 with the 2nd colonial artillery regiment inspires L'Appel des armes.

== Culture and heritage ==
=== Cultural facilities ===
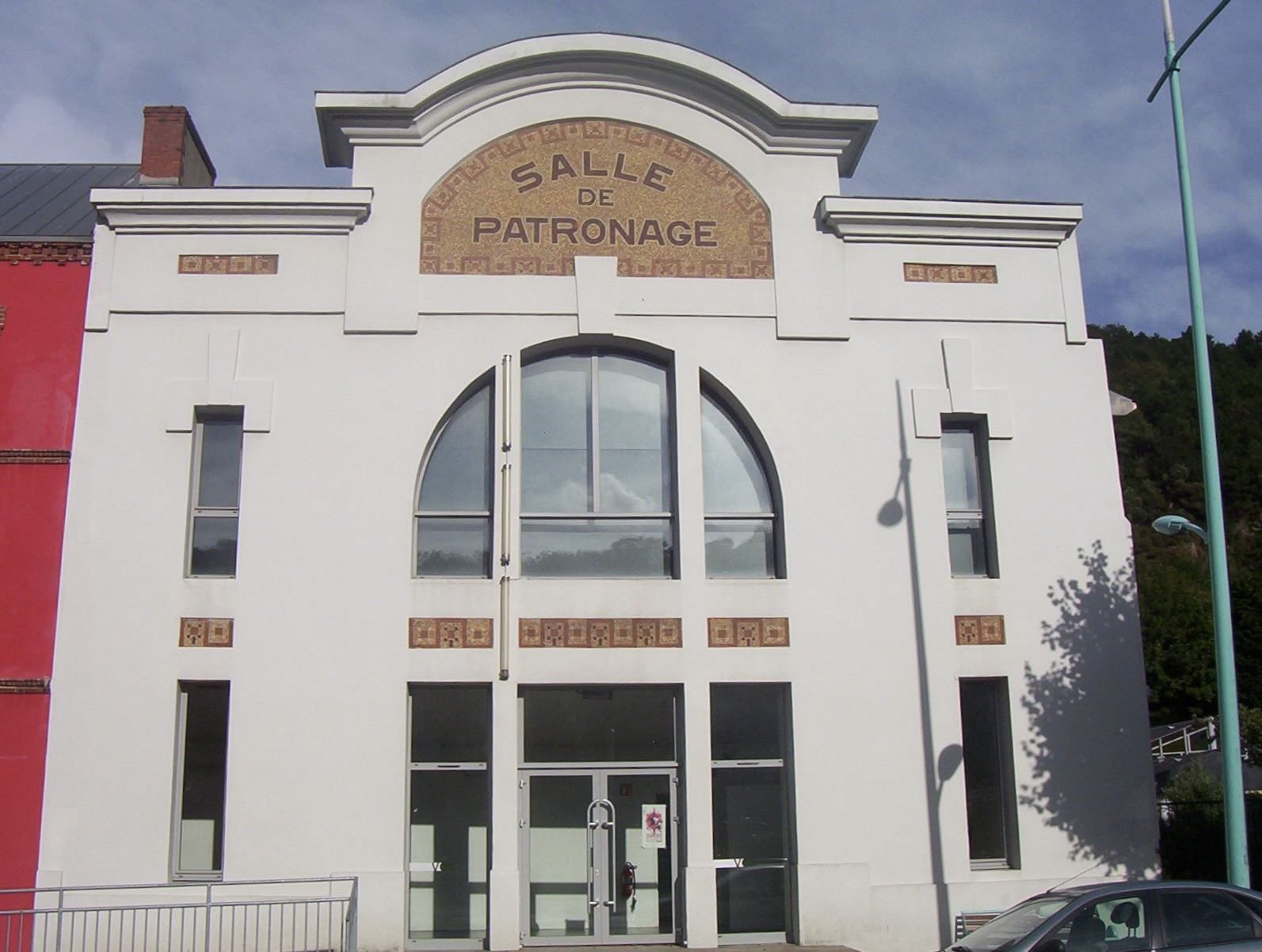
The Vox, a former cinema converted into a theatre, depends upon the National Stage.

With Caen, Cherbourg-Octeville is the main cultural centre of Lower Normandy.

The city is the seat of several learned societies, including the National Academic Society of Cherbourg founded in 1755, National Society of Natural Sciences and Mathematics of Cherbourg formed in 1851, and the Artistic and Industrial society of Cherbourg, incorporated in 1871.

The creation and dissemination of the performing arts are ensured by the Trident, national stage of Italian theatre, the theatre of Octeville and the Vox. Amateur theatre is celebrated by Les Téméraires.

The vocation prioritaire du Centre régional des arts du cirque [Priority Mission of the Regional Centre of Circus Arts] (CRAC) of La Brèche, opened in October 2006, is the residence of circus troops, but instead also offers programming for the public. CRAC participates in the festival of street arts, Charivarue.

In addition, the provision of artistic education is rich, with the Film Industry Institute of Normandy, the school of fine arts and the municipal music school, labelled as a conservatory for communal influence, which has 800 registrants.

After the closure of Ultrasound in Équeurdreville-Hainneville, a unique room of contemporary music of Nord-Cotentin, several associations have come together within the network "La Voix des oreilles" ["The voice of the ears"] and of the place Épicentre, in the former yacht club on Quai Lawton-Collins, where the festival La Terra Trema takes place.

However, the city lacks a large capacity venue, the theatre can accommodate only 700 spectators. After the bitter failure of Cherbourg-Land, this problem has not been resolved at the level of the Cotentin. The Great Hall of the Cité de la Mer, with a space for over 6,000 people, has hosted several concerts, but it is primarily dedicated to the organisation of fairs and exhibitions. Today, the main welcoming complex of large-scale concerts is the Jean-Jaurès Centre of Équeurdreville-Hainneville.

Octeville has retained its patronal festival, the Sainte-Échelle, with holiday fair and parades. Cherbourg restarted its carnival in the 1980s, heir of the Confrérie des Conards, similar to that of Rouen and Évreux.

=== Museums ===
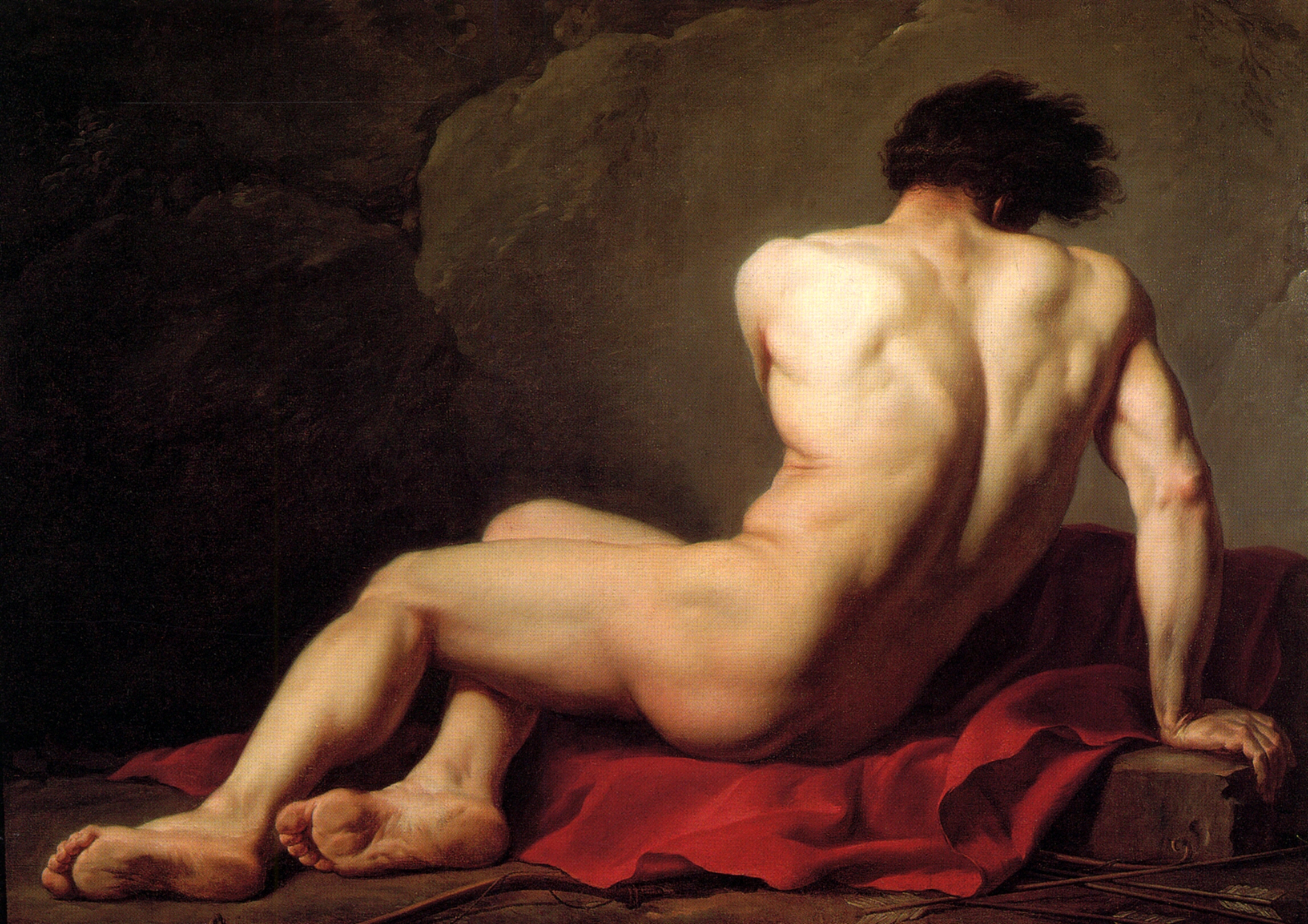
The Patroclus of David, displayed at the Thomas-Henry Museum.

Cherbourg has several museums.

The former home of Emmanuel Liais, mayor of Cherbourg, astronomer and explorer, houses since 1905 the Museum of Natural History and Ethnography, the oldest museum in Cherbourg (founded in 1832), with curio cabinet, collection of stuffed animals, fossils, minerals and ethnographic objects (Egypt, Asia, Oceania, America and Africa), archaeological treasures and library science. It is also the headquarters of the National Society of Natural Sciences and Mathematics of Cherbourg.

The Thomas-Henry Fine Arts Museum, named after its first patron, was inaugurated in 1835 and is now the third collection of Normandy with 300 paintings and sculptures from the 15th to the 20th century. Located in the cultural centre, at the back of the theatre, it presents paintings by French, Flemish, Spanish and Italian artists, as well as sculptures. Presentations of works by Fra Angelico, Simon Vouet, Camille Claudel, and one of the largest collections of works by Jean-François Millet, as well as paintings by Guillaume Fouace native of Réville or the Navy painters. Sculptures by Armand Le Véel are also included.

The Museum of the War and the Liberation, the first of its kind when it was inaugurated by René Coty on 6 June 1954, traces the daily life of Cherbourg civilians during the Occupation and the course of the Liberation of Cotentin, particularly the Battle of Cherbourg. It is installed in the Fort du Roule, centrepiece of the defence of Cherbourg taken by the Americans on 25 June 1944 .

The Cité de la Mer, is a large museum devoted to scientific and historical aspects of maritime subjects. Dedicated to oceanographic exploration, it is a complex installed since 2003 in a part of the remains of the old transatlantic station. It offers giant aquariums, a collection of underwater vehicles, such as those of COMEX, the bathyscaphe Archimède and Redoutable, the first French SSBN built in Cherbourg, fully open to the public.

The Point du jour, a unique contemporary art centre in France, dedicated to photography, was inaugurated in the Bassin zone in November 2008.

=== Literature ===
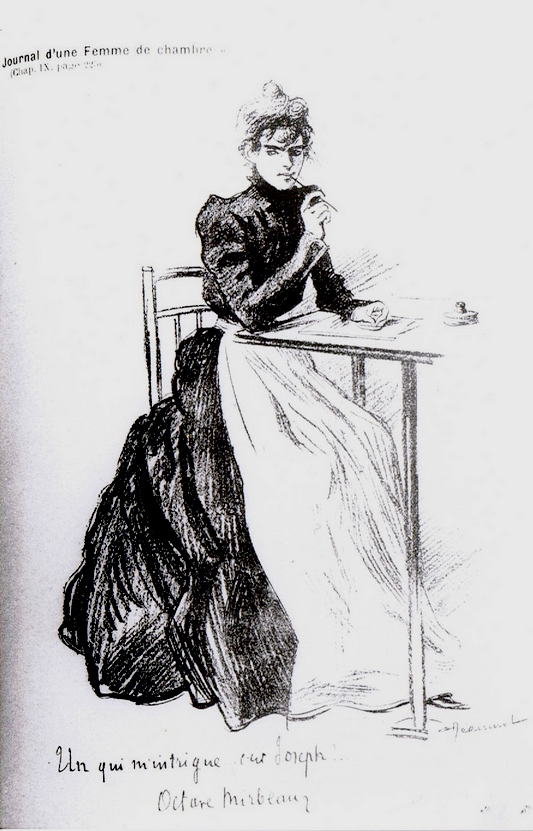
Célestine, of the Journal d’une femme de chambre [Diary of a Chambermaid], by Georges Jeanniot, Le Cri de Paris, 18 November 1900.

The Jacques Prévert Municipal Library, founded in 1831 and opened in 1832, holds the second largest collection in the region, after that of Caen. The purchase of the library of the local scholar Henri-François Duchevreuil, in 1830, complements the 1,855 volumes of the district's library, created at 24 Rue Tour-Carrée, in application of the decree of the Convention of 8 pluviôse year II and composed essentially of works seized from emigrants and deportees. Several donations were then made, including a legacy of 3,000 works by Augustin Asselin in 1844 (with twenty-six incunabula and a ninth-century manuscript De bello iudaico [The Jewish War] of Flavius Josephus, which remains the oldest document in the library) and a gift in 1877 from Jérôme-Frédéric Bignon, Mayor of Le Rozel and heir to the king's librarians. It also has a Norman fonds, an old fonds devoted to botany and another to travel. Housed in a wing of the City Hall in 1855, and then at 9 Rue Thiers (Rue Talluau) from 1896, the library moved into the cultural centre in June 1981, taking the name of Jacques Prévert, who had died four years earlier in La Hague. The library also participates in the Normannia project of the Norman digital library.

The former barracks of the Abbey, dating back to the start of the works of the large dam in 18th-century, has housed one of the five regional centres of history of the National Navy, alongside Brest, Lorient, Rochefort and Toulon, since 1970. The archives of the maritime district of the Channel and the North Sea are grouped here, and the library of the Navy founded in 1836 in Cherbourg and specialising in maritime history with its 23,000 works.

Each year, a network of writing workshops are organised in the metropolitan area, the Mercurielles, and the Festival of the Book and of Youth Comic Books (since 1987).

The Biennial of the 9th Art exhibits the works of comic cartoonists (Enki Bilal in 2002, François Schuiten and Benoît Peeters in 2004, André Juillard in 2006, and Loustal in 2008). In 2002, with the support of the City Hall of Cherbourg, Enki Bilal had planned to create a mural in the old gare maritime to represent the history of migration in the place; This project was rejected on the basis of an official complaint by Bernard Cauvin, president of the CUC and the Cité de la Mer.

Cherbourg-Octeville is the seat of two publishing houses, Isoète founded in 1985 and Le Point du jour established in 1996.

==== Cherbourg-Octeville in literature ====
- Honoré de Balzac cites the engineer Joseph Cachin, constructor of the port of Cherbourg, among the men of genius in Le Curé de village [The Village Priest] and La Duchesse de Langeais [The Duchess of Langeais]. Cherbourg is also present in Le Réquisitionnaire [The Recruit].
- Octave Mirbeau, Le Journal d'une femme de chambre [The Diary of a Chambermaid], 1900: In the final chapter, Celestine became the owner of a cafe in Cherbourg
- Remy de Gourmont, Un cœur virginal [A Virginal Heart], 1907
- Ernest Psichari, L'Appel des armes [The Call to Arms], 1913
- Gilles Rosset, Le Vent dominant [The Prevailing Wind], Grasset, 1979
- Alexis Salatko, Vingt deux nuances de gris [Twenty-two Shades of Grey], 1990
- Jean-Philippe Arrou-Vignod, L’omelette au sucre [The Omelette with Sugar], Gallimard, Folio Junior, 1999
- Robert Sinsoilliez, Une balle pour rien à Cherbourg [A Bullet for Nothing to Cherbourg], 2000
- Salatko, Alexis (2007). Un fauteuil au bord du vide [A Chair at the Edge of the Vacuum] (in French). Paris: Fayard. ISBN 978-2-213-62615-4.
- Ken Follett's novel The Pillars of the Earth features Cherbourg as the hometown of Jacques Cherbourg, a Frenchman washed ashore in England during the European Middle Ages. His son, Jack Jackson, travels to France as an adult and meets his father's family in Cherbourg.
- Kimberly Brubaker Bradley set her novel, For Freedom: The Story of a French Spy in Cherbourg. The narrator, Suzanne Hall (née David), is a spy for the French Resistance.
- Cherbourg (or to be precise its analog in the Lord Darcy universe) is the setting for Randall Garrett's short story "A Case of Identity" and is part of the backdrop for his novel Too Many Magicians.

=== Cinema ===
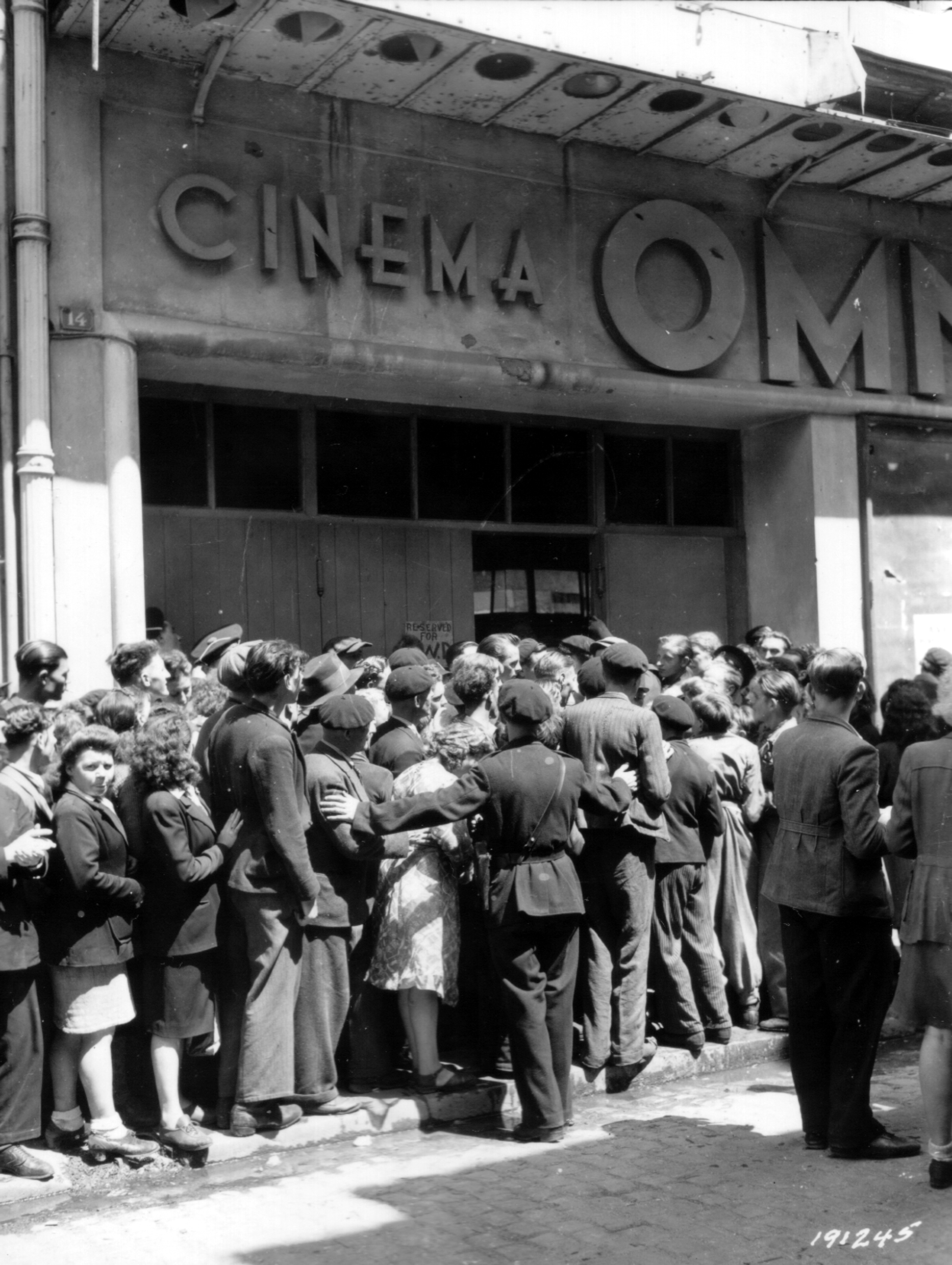
The Omnia cinema in 1944, after the Liberation.

The cinema occupies a significant place in the life of Cherbourg. Many classics of French cinema have been filmed there, such as La Marie du port directed by Marcel Carné and starring Jean Gabin. In 1981, Claude Miller also located the action film Garde à Vue there, though shot in the studio. However, the most emblematic is undoubtedly The Umbrellas of Cherbourg directed by Jacques Demy, a story about Madame Emery and her 17-year-old daughter Geneviève (Catherine Deneuve) who sell umbrellas at their tiny boutique. The film was shot in the summer of 1963, and still contributes to the international renown of the city. Yet long before, at the time of the splendor of the transatlantic liners, Cherbourg was a port of arrival, departure or transit for many stars, including Charlie Chaplin and Burt Lancaster. The city was also birthplace of the filmmaker Jean-Charles Tacchella and the actor Jean Marais.

Festival of cinemas of Ireland and Great Britain, the Cinemovida (festival of the cinema of Spain and Latin America), and Images d'Outre-Rhin (German cinema), as well as Cin'étoiles, screenings of films outdoors in July, animate the local cultural life.

In 2003, the EICAR film school was located in the old buildings of the marine hospital. After three years of loss and liabilities estimated at €1.5 million, it was placed into liquidation in September 2006 and replaced the following month, under the leadership of elders of its teachers by the Institut des métiers du cinéma de Normandie (IMC Normandie) that itself closed its doors in 2011.

The city has a fleet of 17 permanent cinema rooms, distributed over two sites, including one labelled as Art et essai (Revival house).

- Odéon (5 rooms)

Following the opening of the CGR multiplex, the withdrawal of the Soredic, which operated Club 6 (Rue de la Paix) since 1983 and the Odeon (Rue Foch) since 1991, resulted in the closure in 2004 of the first and the revival of the latter city centre cinema, labelled as Art et essai by Fadila Chambelland, the former manager. The cinema had 90,000 admissions in 2006.

The damaged façade of the old cafe of the Grand balcon, which then became Le Central cinema, is in the style of the Second Empire, with caryatids and garlands of flowers.

- Méga CGR (12 rooms)

Opened in 2003 near the boulevard maritime with 2,557 seats; 400,000 admissions in 2006.

- Omnia (1 room)

The historic cinema operated by Pathé, located on the Rue de la Paix, it was bought in the 1990s by the municipality and no longer welcomes any more than rare events. The interior frescoes of R. Lecoq, representing Aeolus and Vulcan, were distinguished in 2006 by the label "20th century heritage" of the Ministry of Culture.

Several cinemas have disappeared, such as the Eldorado (destroyed, Place de la Republique), the Eden (Rue Cachin), the Vox (former patronage room which became a second room of Le Trident (theatre)), and the Saint-Joseph (Rue des Ormes), etc.

==== Films shot in Cherbourg ====
- Le p'tit Parigot (1926), by René Le Somptier
- La Marie du port (1950), by Marcel Carné, with Jean Gabin
- The Umbrellas of Cherbourg (1964), by Jacques Demy, starring Catherine Deneuve
- La Course à l'échalote (1975), directed by Claude Zidi, with Pierre Richard and Jane Birkin
- Roads to the South (1978), Joseph Losey, with Yves Montand
- The Green Ray (1986) of Éric Rohmer
- Foon (2005), directed in part at the EICAR-Cherbourg
- La Boîte noire (2005), by Richard Berry
- Lili and the baobab (2006), Chantal Richard, with Romane Bohringer
- Rumba (2008) Fiona Gordon, Dominique Abel, Bruno Romy, etc.
- Love Me No More (2008), by Jean Becker, with Albert Dupontel
- Q (2011), by Laurent Bouhnik

=== Language ===
The Cherbourg population spoke le haguais, a variant of Cotentinais Norman, while having some specifics regarding the pronunciation of certain words.

In Cotentinais Norman, Cherbourg is called Tchidbouo [tʃidbwu:] and Octeville, Otteville [ɔtvil]. Their inhabitants are the Tchidbouorqŭais and the Ottevillais [tʃidbwuʁtʃje:] and [ɔtvile:].

While French was necessary in Rouen in the 19th century, Norman remained widely used from Cherbourg to Caen, up to the First World War.

Alfred Rossel was the leading local figure of the dialect authors of the 19th century. He published his Chansonnettes normandes, among which Sus la mé became an anthem of the Cotentin Peninsula. At that time, Jean Fleury was critical of its approximate spelling and poor mastery of the language.

Various actors are now trying to promote the local use of the Norman. The Alfred Rossel society makes live folklore and language. Le Boué-jaun a Cherbourg-based magazine, published his texts in Norman, and one of three popular Norman universities is based here.

=== Gastronomy ===
A large fishing port, Cherbourg-Octeville offers a wide variety of fish (yellowtail, bar, plaice, mackerel, rays, red mullet, pollock, lemon sole, small-spotted catshark, etc.), crustaceans (brown crab, spider crab, lobster) and shellfish (Saint-Jacques, scallops, mussels), caught off the coast of the Cotentin peninsula. The so-called Demoiselles de Cherbourg are small lobsters. Cherbourg is also located near three oyster areas (Blainville, Saint-Vaast and Isigny). The most traditional preparation is the matelote. Alexandre Dumas also presented the recipe of the "queue de merlan à la mode de Cherbourg " [tail of whiting in the Cherbourg manner], with butter and oysters.

From 1464, the bakers of Cherbourg held Royal permission to develop their breads based on seawater, thus avoiding paying for the salt and the gabelle [salt tax]. On the occasion of the visit of Napoleon, they would have created folded bread, country bread ball, oval, which is folded back on itself to be cooked, thus offering a tighter bicorn-shaped sandwich which came to be called "pain Napoléon" [Napoleon bread]. Fleury indicated that at the beginning of the 19th century, the principal food of Nord-Cotentin was barley bread, buckwheat porridge and pork-based products, and on feast days, the galette, a "type of dough composed of buckwheat flour, milk and eggs, and cooked in a thin film on the tile with butter", watered, of course, with cider.

The agglomeration is located in the AOC areas of the Pont-l'Évêque and of the Camembert of Normandy as well as being partially within the Calvados, Pommeau de Normandie and the cider of Normandy. It also benefits from the IGP of the cider of Normandy, Normandy pork and Normandy poultry. More broadly, the kitchen of Nord-Cotentin is that of Normandy, in which dairy products (butter, cream, milk, cheese, etc.) and apples (as fruit or alcohol) dominate.

Since 2010, the restaurant le Pily, of the Valognes restaurateur Pierre Marion, holds a star in the Michelin Guide.

=== Heritage ===
==== Civil monuments ====
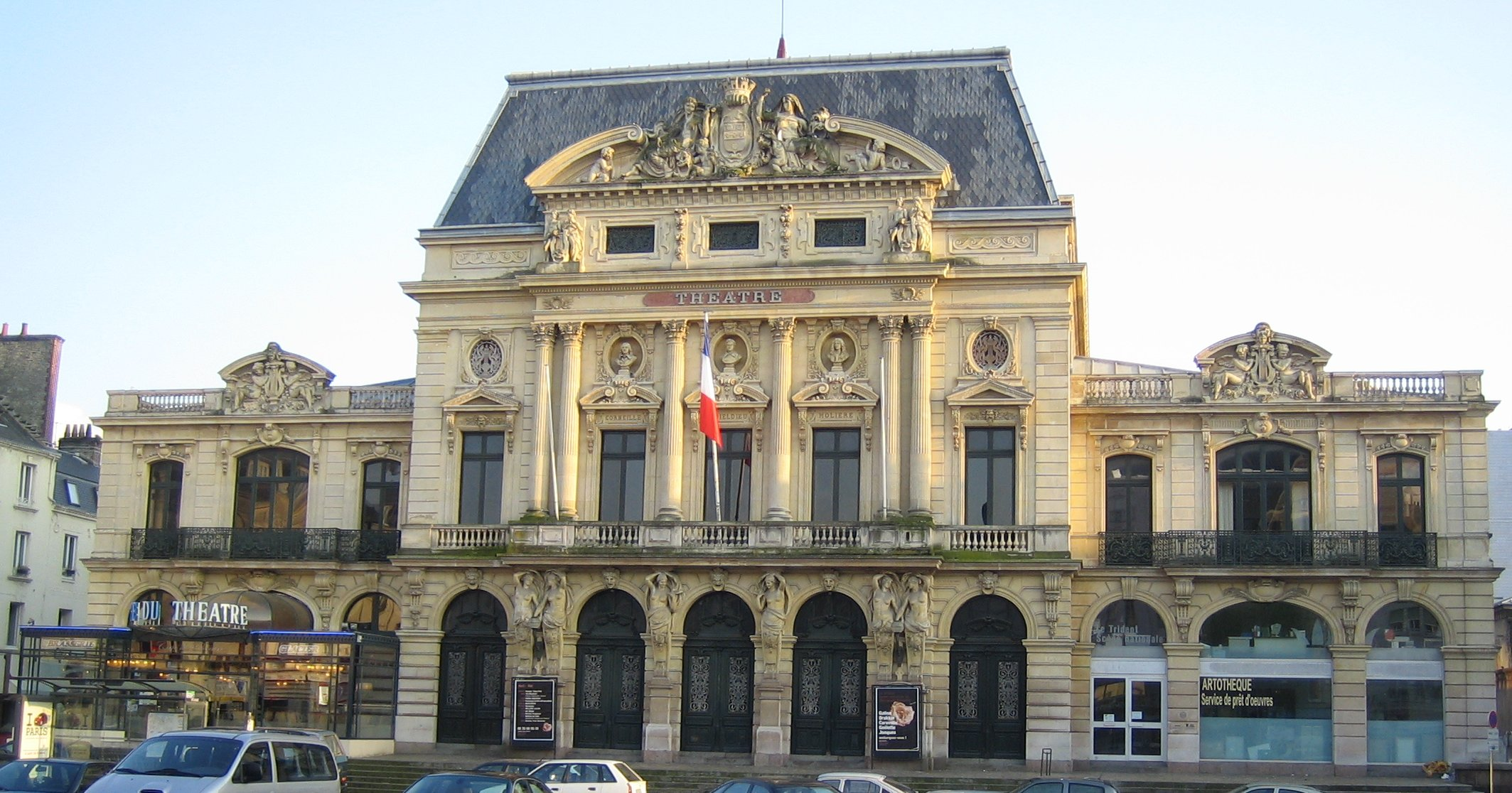
The Italian theatre.

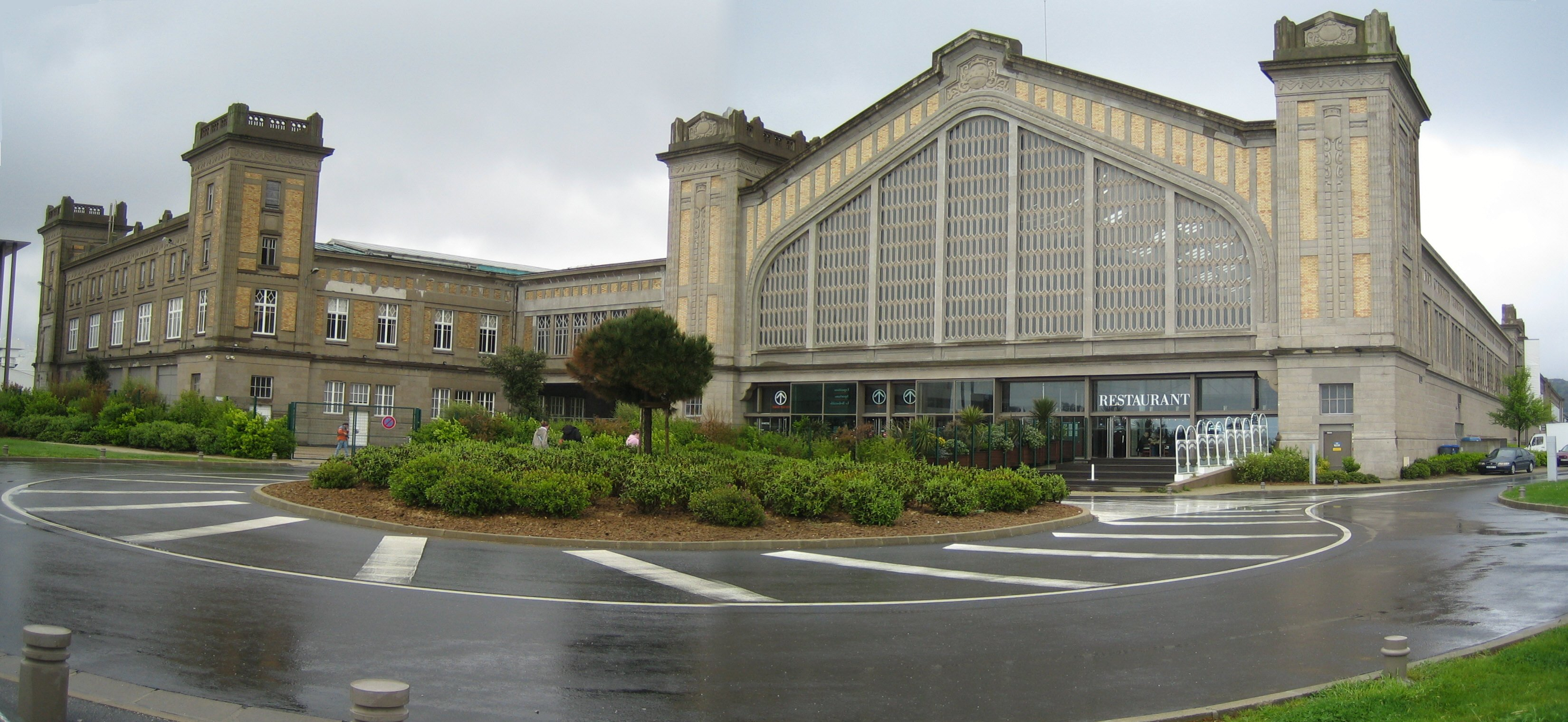
The gare maritime.

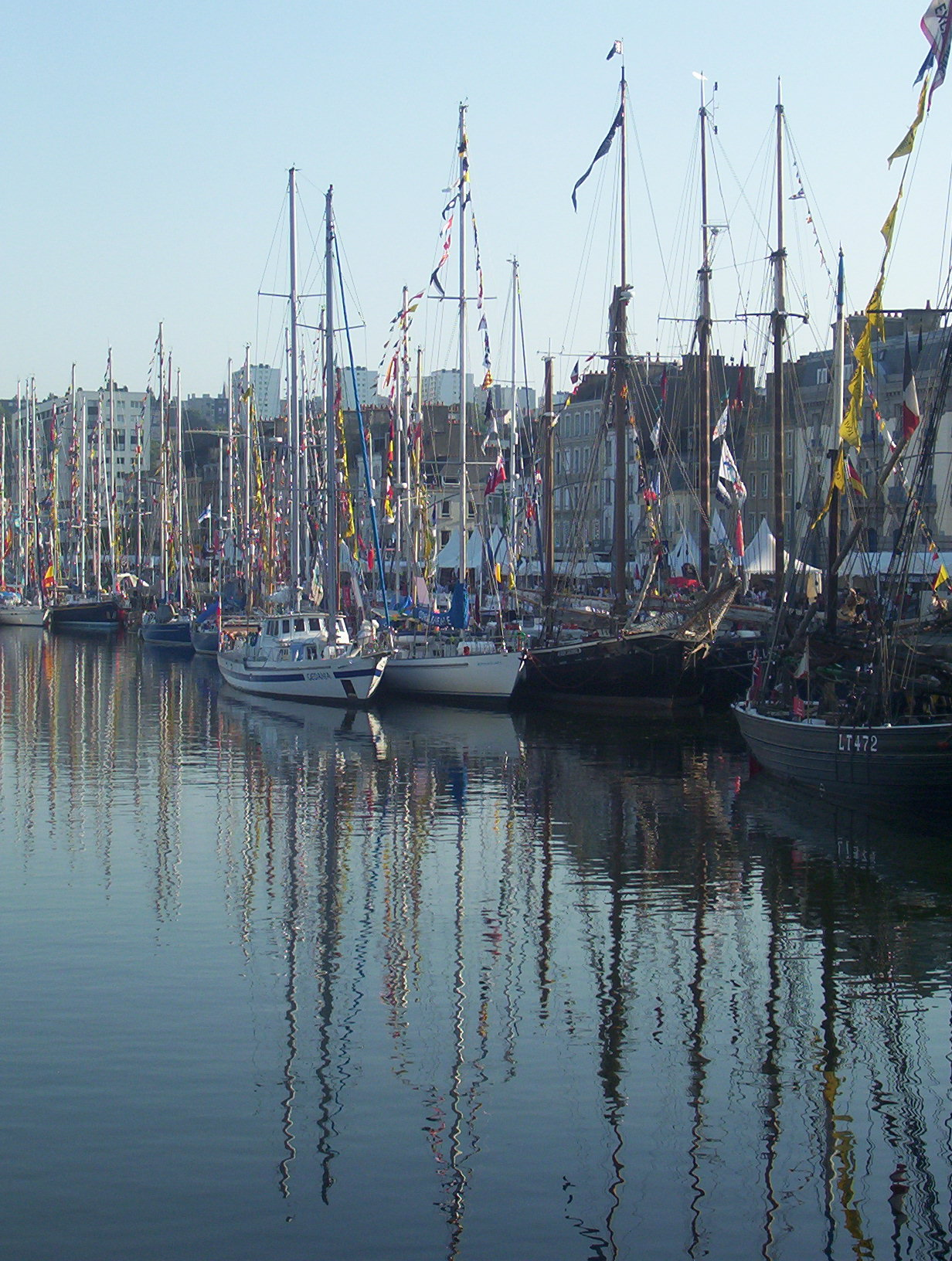
The commercial dock, during the Tall Ships' Race 2005.

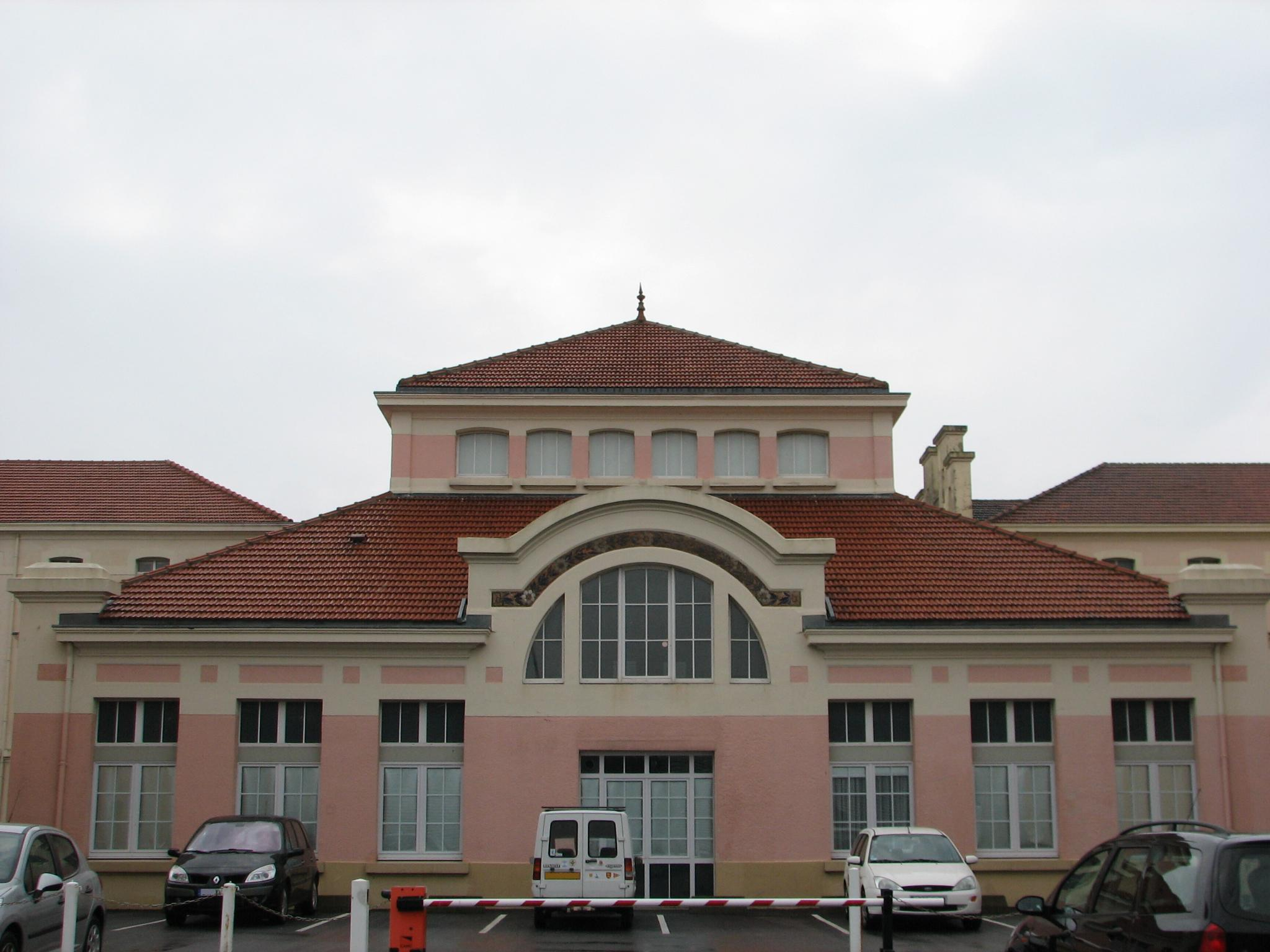
The central pavilion of the Atlantic Hotel.

The Italian Theatre is one of the last Italian theatres built in France (1880). Opened in 1882, it was built on the plans of Charles de Lalande, on the site of the grain market. The façade pays homage to Molière, Boieldieu and Corneille. It has been classified a historical monument since 1984 with its two side returns and corresponding roofing; also classified are the vestibule, the grand staircase, the hall and foyer, as well as the 13 original decorations. The ceiling is the work of Georges Clairin. With three galleries, it accommodates up to 600 spectators.

The Mouchel Fountain, named after the patron and director of the journal Le Phare de la Manche, stands at the centre of the Place Général-de-Gaulle. A monumental fountain in cast iron, it was created by Louis Eugène Gutelle in 1895.

The Hotel Epron de la Horie (named after the Vice Admiral and Marine Minister Jacques Epron de la Horie, owner under the first Empire) or ancient customs is located at the corner of Rue de Val-de-Saire and the wharf of the Old Arsenal. Built in 1781 by Jacques Martin Maurice, "contractor of the King's works" in schist (cover and body of the building) and red brick (window frames), registered as a historical monument since 16 February 1965. Successively barracks of the Swiss, auxiliary Hospital of the work of the harbour, home of shipowners Richer, Cousin, Despréaux and Lias in the 19th century and a customs house during the interwar period, it is now the headquarters of the Groupe Caisse d'Épargne.

The former Gare Maritime de Cherbourg is the largest French Art Deco monument. Built by René Levavasseur from 1928 and inaugurated in 1933 by President Lebrun, it could accommodate two ships simultaneously. Listed as an historical monument in 1989 and 2000, it was redeveloped in 2002 to become an oceanographic complex, the Cité de la Mer, where one can visit the SNLE Le Redoutable, and host since December 2006 of a cruise terminal.

The hôtel Atlantique [Atlantic Hotel], opposite the maritime station, was also built by René Levavasseur, in iron and cement and in the Art Deco style, for the three transatlantic companies which served Cherbourg, the Cunard Line, the White Star Line and the Red Star Line, grouped into the Société anonyme de l’Hôtel Atlantique. It hosted on 5,400 m^{2} (58,000 sq ft) the emigrants (third class passengers), mainly from Eastern Europe, who stayed there for an average of 12 days to undergo sanitary and customs controls. The building thus included a section for infected and a section for disinfected with a capacity of 2,000 people. Begun in 1920, opened in 1926, it closed eight years later. Requisitioned under the Occupation and Liberation, it was bought by Félix Amiot to accommodate some of its shipyard employees. It has hosted the services of the Chamber of commerce and industry of Cherbourg-Cotentin since 1991. The central pavilion is included in the inventory of historic monuments since October 2001.

Statues of Themis and Minerva, Roman goddesses of justice and war respectively, of Houdon and Roland and which were stored in the courtyard of the Palais Bourbon during their replacement on the frontispiece of the Chamber of Deputies by casts during the renovation of the façade, were available to the city in June 1989, through Olivier Stirn, Minister of Tourism, and President of the Communauté urbaine de Cherbourg [Urban community of Cherbourg]. After restoration by Pierre Bataille of Poclain, they were each placed in 1990 and 1993 on a roundabout, the Minerva of Philippe-Laurent Roland, near the Cité de la Mer, the Themis of Jean-Antoine Houdon at the foot of the Montagne du Roule. Carved around 1810, they have been classified as historic monuments since June 1990.

The town hall was built at the beginning of the 19th century; It was enlarged twice, first in 1850 by a south-west wing forming an L-shape with the first building, and then under the Second Empire (salon of the Empress), and reworked after the Liberation. Inside, a staircase serves the Grand Lounge and the lounge of the Empress, which houses portraits of Napoleon III and Eugénie by Winterhalter, with - between the two – a rotunda room for the paintings of Michel-Adrien Servant recalling the major events in the history of the city. Since 1858, the Council Chamber contains the 16th century chimney of the abbot's house of the Abbey of Notre-Dame-du-Vœu, purchased by the municipality in 1841 and classified as a historical monument since 1905. The three lounges and the stairs have been registered since 13 August 2004.

The maritime hospital, a former regional hospital of the armies of René-Le-Bas, built by a decision of Napoleon III and opened 15 February 1869, it was decommissioned in 2000 and rehabilitated as an academic and cultural centre in 2002. The Napoleon III style buildings are surrounded by a large park.

The docks and Port Chantereyne are regularly brought to life by various events: Stopovers of prestigious liners (Queen Elizabeth 2, Queen Mary 2, etc.), armada, sailing races and such. The docks were constructed in 1994 with the lighting by Yann Kersalé. The marina, first French port of call, extends beyond the Plage Verte, old beach redeveloped into lawn after the creation of the port. Recreational and leisure facilities are located here (pool, skating rink, bowling, services for boaters, etc.). In the commercial wet dock is the Jacques-Louise, the last wooden trawler built in the shipyards of Cherbourg Bellot in 1959, the former Cherbourg Blue Riband, decommissioned in 1991, registered in 1996, then classified as a historic monument in 1999. A trawler in oak wood of the Orne, designed for lateral fishing off the coast, it has been open to the public since summer 2004.

==== Memorials ====
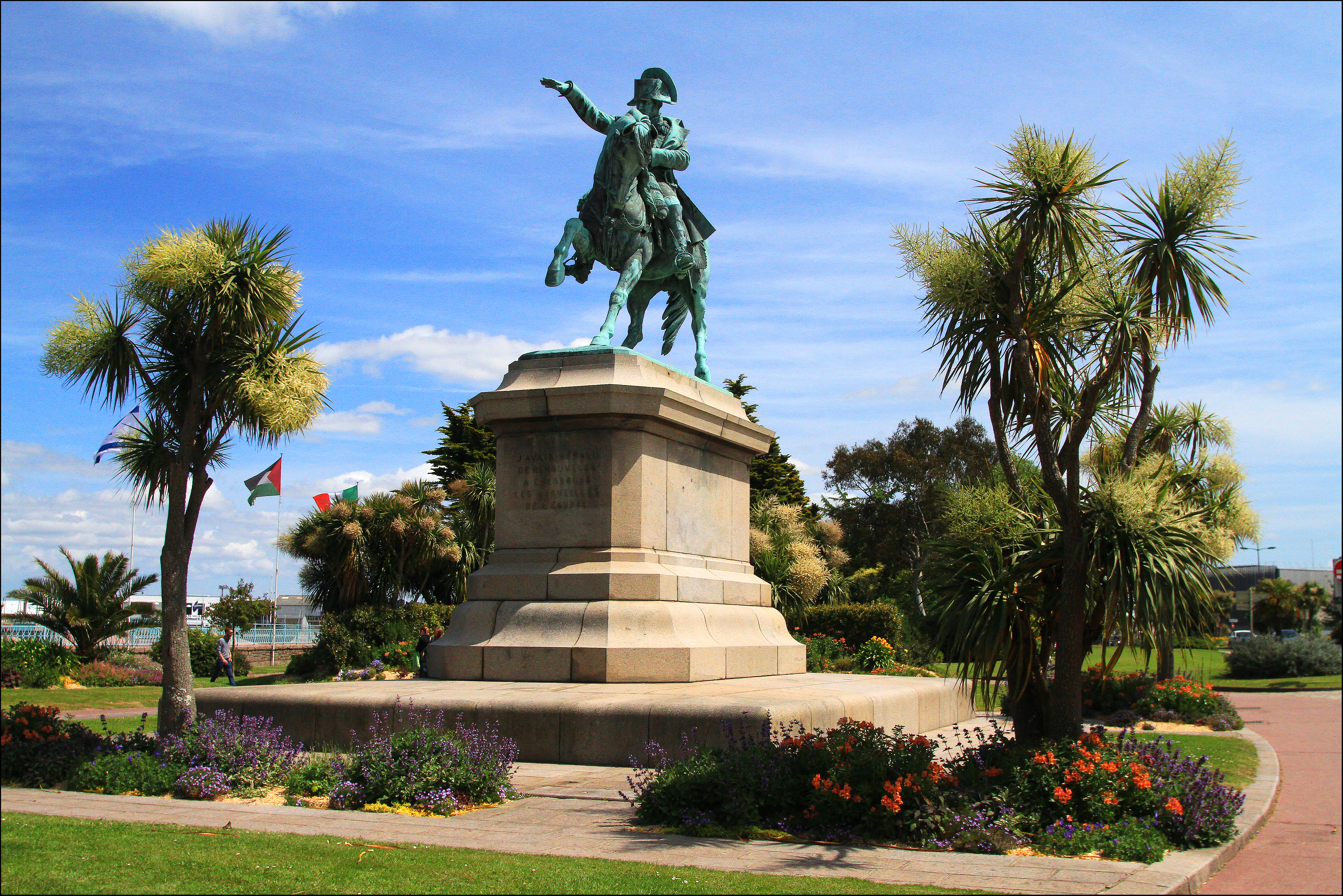
Statue of Napoleon

The Equestrian Statue of Napoleon I faces the basilica, on the Place Napoléon. The work of Armand Le Véel, it represents the Emperor contemplating the harbour and the military port. On the base, reads an excerpt from the Memorial of Sainte-Hélène, dated 15 July 1816: I had resolved to renew to Cherbourg the wonders of Egypt, i.e. a pyramid with central fort and a new Lake Moeris, for the outer harbour, dug into the rock. The statue, erected in 1858 on the occasion of the visit of Napoleon III, recalls the importance of the Emperor in the expansion of Cherbourg. Around this emblematic monument of the city, registered in August 2006 and classified as an historic monument on 31 January 2008, extends the Plage verte, the old artificial beach until the postwar period, which runs along the marina.

The monument of the Duke of Berry, in the Place de la République, commemorates the landing of the son of the future Charles X, back in France on the British frigate Eurotas on 13 April 1814, after the fall of the Empire. Completed in 1816, it consists of an obelisk of 25 ft (7.6 m) in pink granite of Flamanville, surmounting a fountain of grey granite, where four bronze lions' heads spew water into a basin dug in the same block.

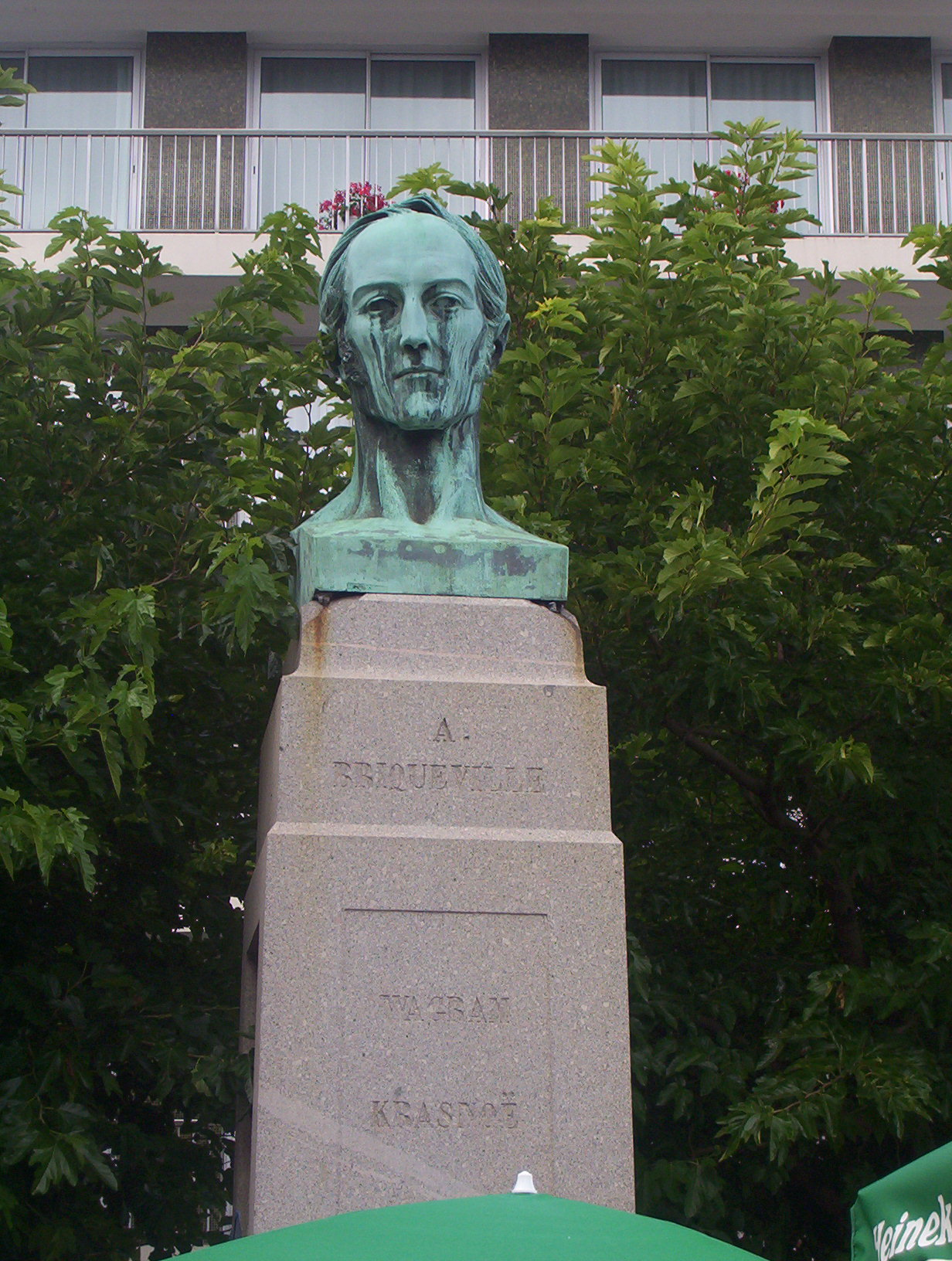
Bricqueville by David d’Angers.

The bust of Colonel Bricqueville, on the Quai de Caligny, was inaugurated on 12 May 1850, in homage to the Colonel of the Imperial Dragons and Bonapartist deputy of Cherbourg who died in 1844. This 1.45 m (4.8 ft) bust of Hermes is a bronze of David d'Angers on a 4 ft (1.2 m) column of granite of the architect Lemelle, on which one can read the name of four battles where Bricqueville is illustrated: Wagram, Krasnoi, Antwerp and Versailles. Two bronze reliefs evoke the military (a sword) and parliamentary (a forum), were melted by the Germans in 1944. The monument has been listed as an historical monument since August 2006.

The statue of Jean-François Millet, inaugurated in the public garden on 22 September 1892, for the centenary of the First Republic, honours the "painter of peasants", student at the Museum of Cherbourg. Funded by a subscription launched by the municipality in 1886 and taken over by Parisian circles, the realisation of the marble bust (1.05 m (3.4 ft) high) was entrusted to Henri Chapu; after his death, it was completed by his pupil Jean-Ernest Bouteiller who had assisted him in the allegorical group in bronze (2.95 m (9.7 ft) high) of a peasant woman with her daughter in arms and laying flowers of the fields on the bust, supported on a pedestal and granite rocks (4.45 m (14.6 ft) high, 2.55 m (8.4 ft) wide, 2.6 m (8.5 ft) of depth). The monument is inscribed since August 2006.

The monument to the dead of the Surcouf, inaugurated at the end of the marina pier on 23 September 1951 by General de Gaulle, commemorates the memory of 130 sailors from the Free French Naval Forces submarine, built at Cherbourg and which sank on 18 February 1942 in the Pacific.

==== Military monuments ====
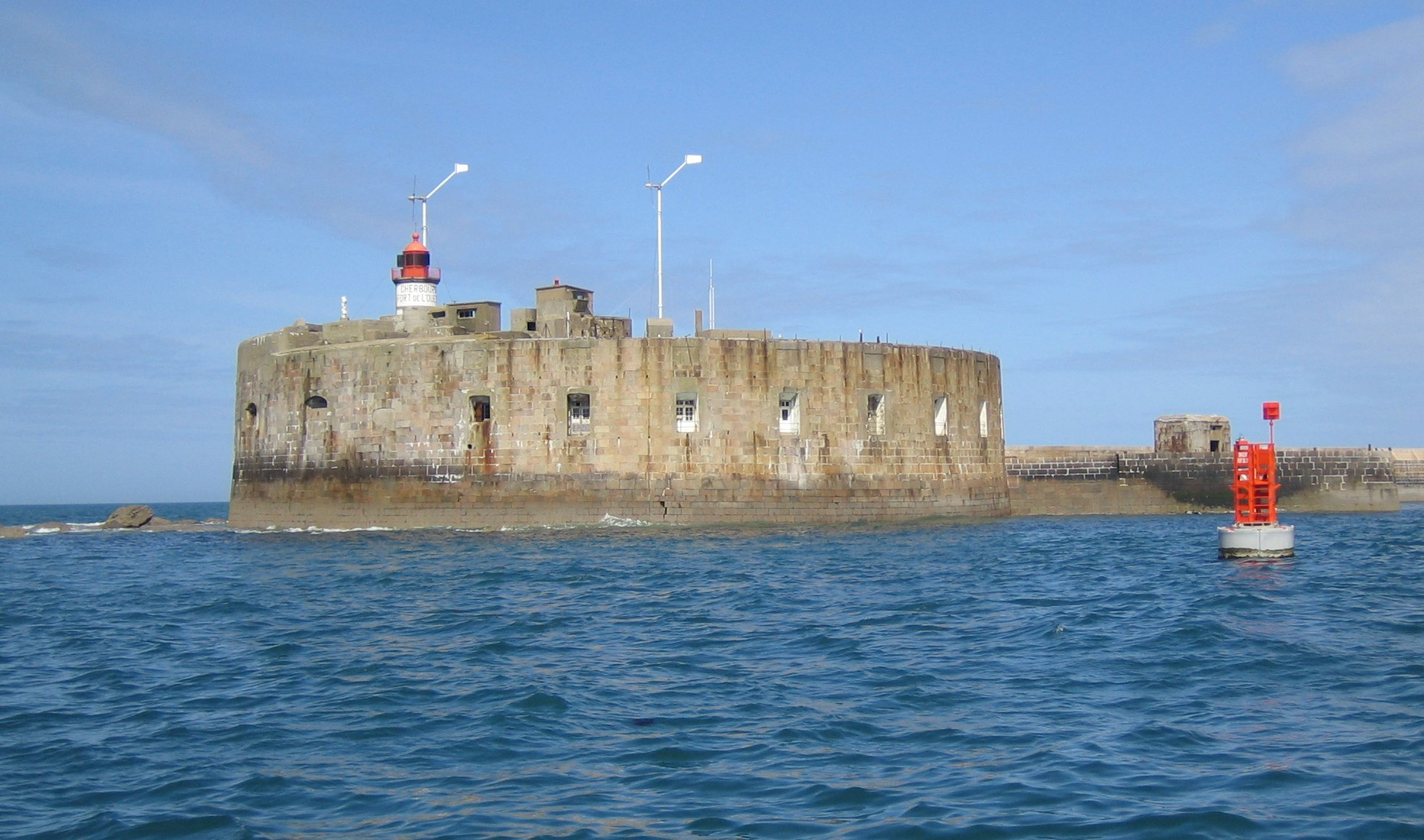
Fort de l’Ouest.

Cherbourg Harbour is the largest artificial harbour of the world. Begun in 1783, the central wall was completed in 1853 and equipped with three forts in 1860. Built 4 km (2.5 mi) from the coast, the offshore seawall is 3.64 km (2.26 mi) long, with an average width of 100 m (330 ft) at its base and 12 m (39 ft) at its peak, and a height of 27 m (89 ft). The three sea walls cover over 6 km (3.7 mi) combined.

The fort de l’Île Pelée [fort of Pelée Island], a defensive element to the east of the sea wall, was designed by Ricard and Decaux and built between 1777 and 1784. It was named fort Royal, fort National, fort Imperial, before taking the name of the island on which it was built. It served as a prison during the Revolution.

Fort du Roule (Museum of the War and Liberation) is located on the Montagne du Roule. The location in 1650 of the Chapel of Notre-Dame-de-Protection, abandoned during the Revolution, razed in 1870, this highest point of the city [117 m (384 ft)] welcomed a redoubt to protect the harbour in 1793. In 1853, the present fort was built. The place of the last fighting in 1940, it was reinforced by the Germans in 1943 with a battery located on the hillside overlooking the harbour, below the fort. Composed of four casemates for 105 mm (4.1 in) guns and a position for the direction of firing, with several tunnels and access dug into the rock, for the Germans it became the strong point of the fortresse de Cherbourg and of the Atlantic Wall. On 6 June 1954, René Coty inaugurated the first French Museum of Liberation there. At the end of a winding road named chemin des Résistants [Path of Resistants], the fort offers a panoramic view of the city and the harbour. The battery and a part of the German ammunition storage tunnels were classified as a historic monument in 1995, and another part is converted into an underground laboratory for measurement of radioactivity for the school of military application of atomic energy.

==== Religious monuments ====
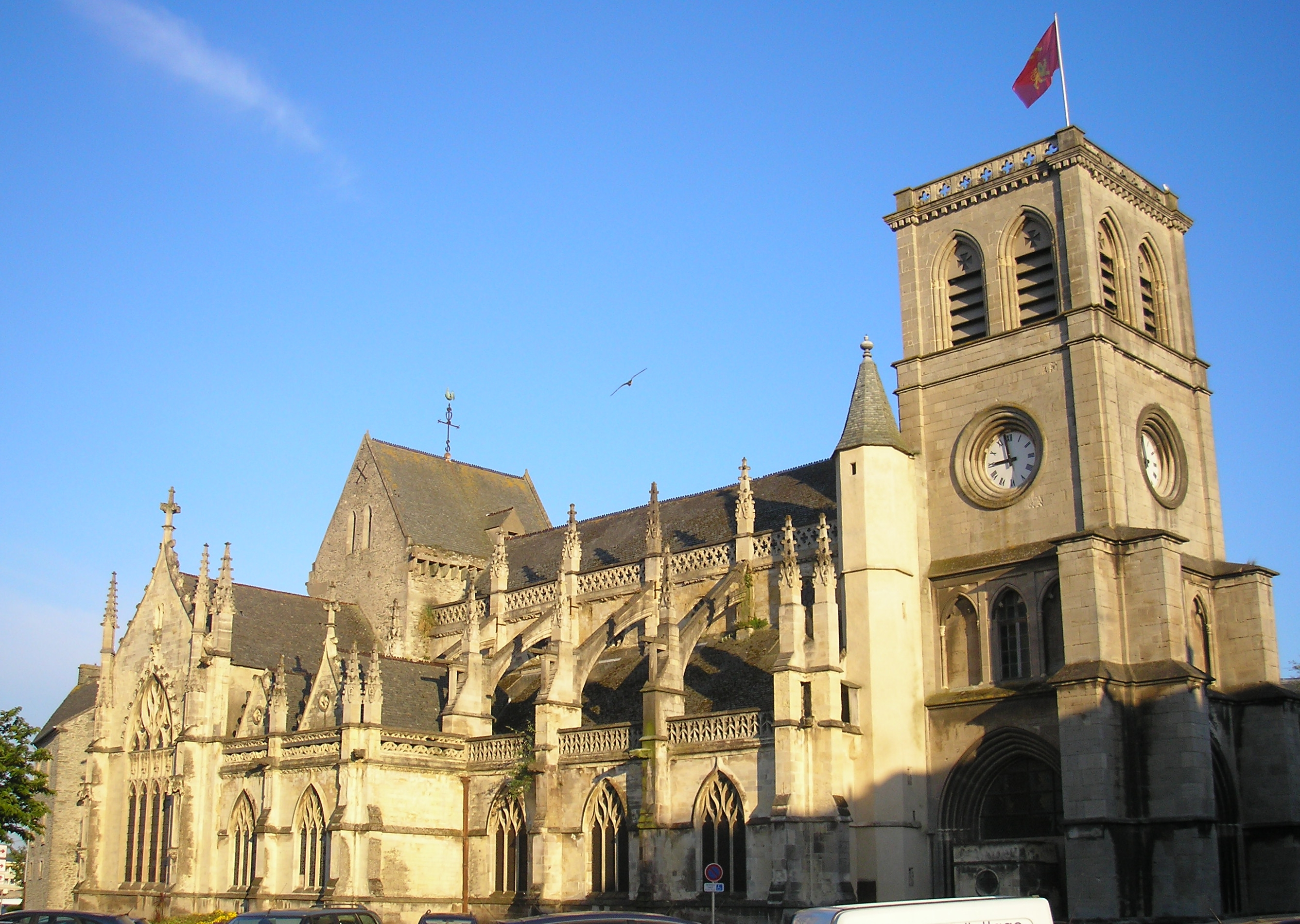
The Basilica of Sainte-Trinité.

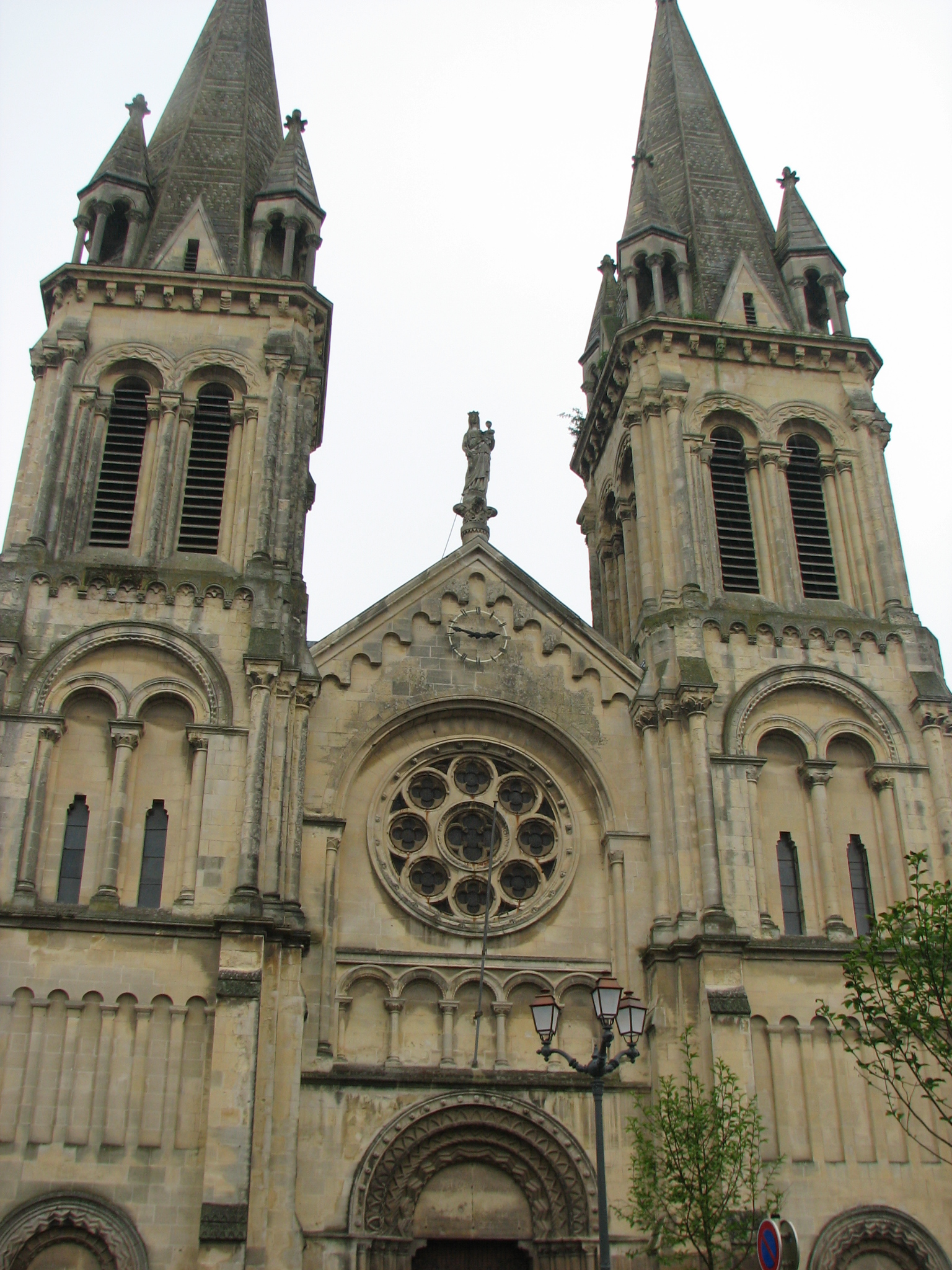
The Church of Notre-Dame-du-Vœu.

The Abbey of Notre-Dame-du-Vœu was founded in 1145, on the coast of Équeurdreville, at the Croûte du Homet, by Empress Matilda. Located outside the city walls, it was regularly looted and burned during the incessant Anglo-French battles, then during the Wars of Religion. Subject to the regime of a commendatory abbot in 1583, it declined until its closure in 1774. Its lands were annexed in 1778 for the construction of the military port, and it became the residence of the Duke of Harcourt, who sheltered the King in 1786. The place was then transformed into a hospital, into a prison, and into the Martin des Pallières Barracks for the marine infantry.

The company town of Chantereyne was built in 1928, until its destruction in June 1944. Bought by the Town Hall in 1961, the Abbey has been slowly restored since 1965. The smokestack of the Abbey House (16th century) is kept in the council room of the city hall, the west portal of the Church (13th century) is placed in the public garden. The remains of Martin des Pallières barracks were classified in 1913, then all of the buildings, remains and soil of the abbey, in September 2002. The grave slab of Guillaume de Margerai, priest of Querqueville, who died in the 1280s, uncovered, has been classified as an historic monument since 1995.

The Basilica of Sainte-Trinité, begun in the 11th century at the request of William the Conqueror, remained the only parish church of the city until the 19th century. The stately church dedicated to Our Lady in the castle was destroyed along with the fortress, in the 17th century. The Trinité was enlarged and transformed significantly in the 13th century, the nave was rebuilt, the choir and the bell tower is recorded from after 1450. After a rampage by January 1794, it had added a new square bell tower 26 m (85 ft) in 1828 and restored in neo-flamboyant style in 1865. Registered as a historical monument since March 1944, Trinité has a rich religious furniture, including a high altar of 1809, a wood pulpit carved by Pierre Fréret (1767), a retable of Armand Fréret (1814) and the great organs by Cavaillé-Coll.

The church of Notre-Dame du Roule was built at the foot of the Montagne du Roule between 1832 and 1842 under the leadership of the "poet-Barber" Michel Legoupil and by the subscription of the faithful of the peripheral quarters of Roule which grew, such as the districts of the Vœu and the Polle.

The church of Notre-Dame-du-Vœu, begun in 1850 on subscription of the parishioners and in the Romanesque style due to the scarcity of resources, was erected on a pasture, known as les briques, offered by Mr. de Virandeville. In 1855, the municipality completes the nave inaugurated in 1852 by a transept and a more ornate choir, and in 1862 the façade and two bell towers. A work of 61.5 m (202 ft) in length, the church houses a large organ by Duputel (1885), classified as a historic monument since 1990 and the stained glass windows of 1834, 1858–60 and 1949–58.

The Church of Saint-Clément was built within the quarter of the Val-de-Saire, facing the Pasteur hospital, between June 1853 and 1856 by the architect of the city, Geufroy. 52 m (171 ft) long, it is of Greco-Roman inspiration, with a porch in the triangular pediment supported by four columns with Doric capitals. It houses the altars of the Virgin (1863) by François Fréret and Saint-Clément (1864) by Louis-Victor Fréret, acquired from the Basilica of Sainte-Trinité in 1846, an organ (1881), painting of the twelve apostles (1935) the Rock of Césigné and stained glass (1953) of Mauméjean.

The Church of Saint-Pierre and Saint-Paul, on the area of Octeville, was built between 1967 and 1969 while the "grand ensemble" of Provinces was born. The triangular and irregular modern architecture of Paul Vimond symbolises "the tent of God in among the houses of men", a sacred art inspired by the Second Vatican Council (1962-1965). Another Church was built on Octeville during those years: The Church of Sainte-Marie-Madeleine-Postel opened in 1966 in the quarter of Fourches and decommissioned in 1990.

The Church of Saint-Martin of Octeville, dating from the 12th century, is the historic parish church of Octeville which depended on the Abbey of Notre-Dame-du-Vœu. Romanesque, it has an octagonal saddleback steeple. The nave was remodelled in the 18th century. A relief depicting the Last Supper has been classified as a historic monument since 1908.

== Military life ==
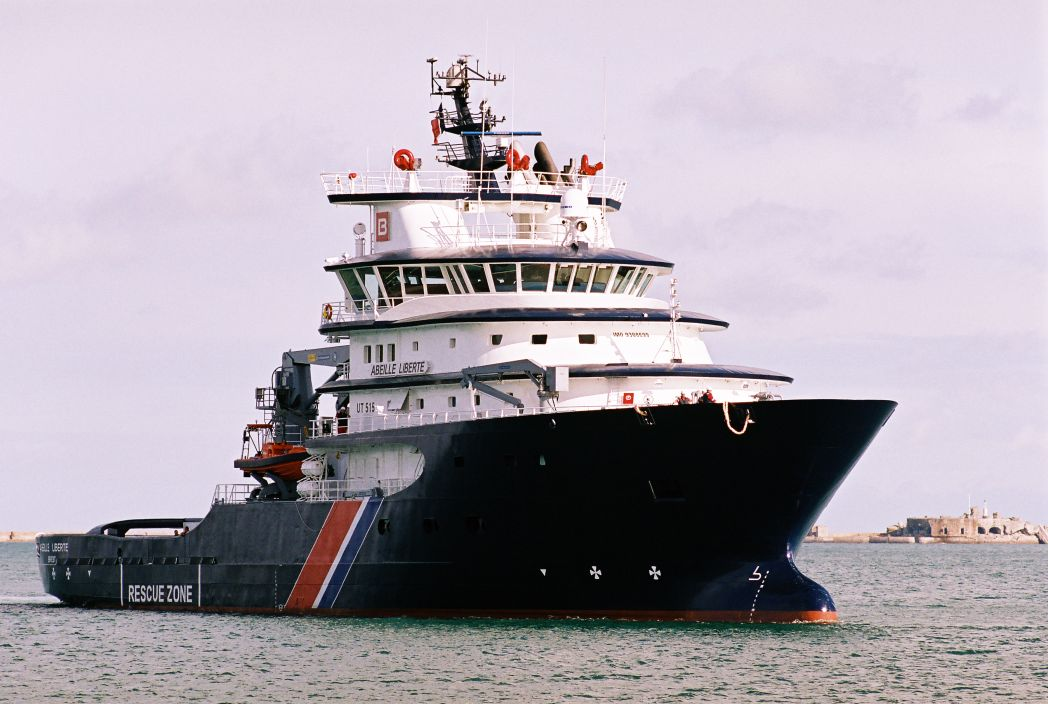
Arrival of the Abeille Liberté at Cherbourg-Octeville.

During the Middle Ages, Cherbourg, a stronghold of the Cotentin peninsula, was home to a small garrison for the protection of the fortress. With the implementation of the harbour and military port, Cherbourg became a port of war at the end of the 18th century, with a large garrison. In 1798, it had 1,332 men, or a tenth of the population, divided mainly between the barracks of the Abbey, current historical Service of the Navy, which housed 542 men of the 4th brigade and the Maurice Quarter, in the Hôtel Epron de la Horie, home to 227 men. Numbers were brought to 3,000 men for the completion of the work, by a decree of germinal year XI.

During the 20th century, Cherbourg, a strategic point during both world wars, adapted to new threats. It then hosted a large garrison of the Navy, an artillery regiment and a Hôpital des Armées known locally as "marine hospital". In the late 1990s and early 2000s, the presence of the army weakened by the transfer of the northern fleet to Brest and the closure of the maritime hospital renamed René-Le-Bas.

Yet Cherbourg remained a base of the first order of the National Navy, as the seat of the Maritime Prefecture of Manche and the North Sea and of the Maritime Gendarmerie grouping of Manche. The naval base is the homeport of five patrol vessels of the Navy and the coastguard, group of the clearance divers sleeve and its building-base the Vulcain, the tug Abeille Liberté and various support vessels. It is also the headquarters of the Operational Training of Surveillance and Territorial Information of Cherbourg (Cherbourg FOSIT) which brings together thirteen semaphores and the lookout of the maritime district. In addition, a flotilla 35 F Dauphin helicopter is based at Cherbourg – Maupertus Airport. The operation of the military port is borne by the directions of the Commissioner of the Navy, maritime works and information systems of the Navy, as well as the branch of the support service of the fleet and the military workshop of the Cherbourg fleet.

Cherbourg is also a training hub of the armed forces through the School of Military Applications of Atomic Energy (EAMEA), in charge of the joint education of military specialists in material sciences, of techniques and of nuclear safety and the École des fourriers de Querqueville, devoted to education of the officers of the three armed forces in business administration, management, human resources and the restoration to the training of specialists of the restoration of the national gendarmerie and the homes of the Navy staff.

Proposals for reform on the organization and the distribution of the French Army, presented in the spring of 2008 in the White Paper on Defence and National Security planned in the context of the French General Review of Public Policies raise the concern of civilian personnel of the defence of the city, including the construction of submarines. According to projects, Cherbourg-Octeville would become one of 90 defence bases around 2010. In a pooling of means and the establishment of support for the armed forces, the city would retain military and civilian activities, and would host new regiments for the army and of the air force to constitute one of the largest bases of defence. However, the Navy in Cherbourg-Octeville would lose 220 jobs, including civilians, through including the division of half of the staff of the Directorate of maritime works, the abolition of 30 posts including 5 civilians in the École des fourriers and the Atomic school, the loss of 27 posts including 14 civilians in the direction of information systems, and the disarmament of the Vulcain, Acharné, Coralline and Élan. National orders for DCNS could be spread over several years, also reducing human needs there, especially among the subcontractors.

Several military units were stationed at Cherbourg during the 20th century:

- 8th Infantry Regiment, 1939 - 1940
- 25th Infantry Regiment, 1870 - 1914
- 119th Infantry Regiment,
- 77th Territorial Infantry Regiment, 1870 - 1914
- 2nd Artillery Regiment of Foot, 1914
- 1st Marine Artillery Regiment, 1906
- 2nd Colonial Artillery Regiment, 1906
- 5th Colonial Artillery Regiment, 1906

== Gallery ==
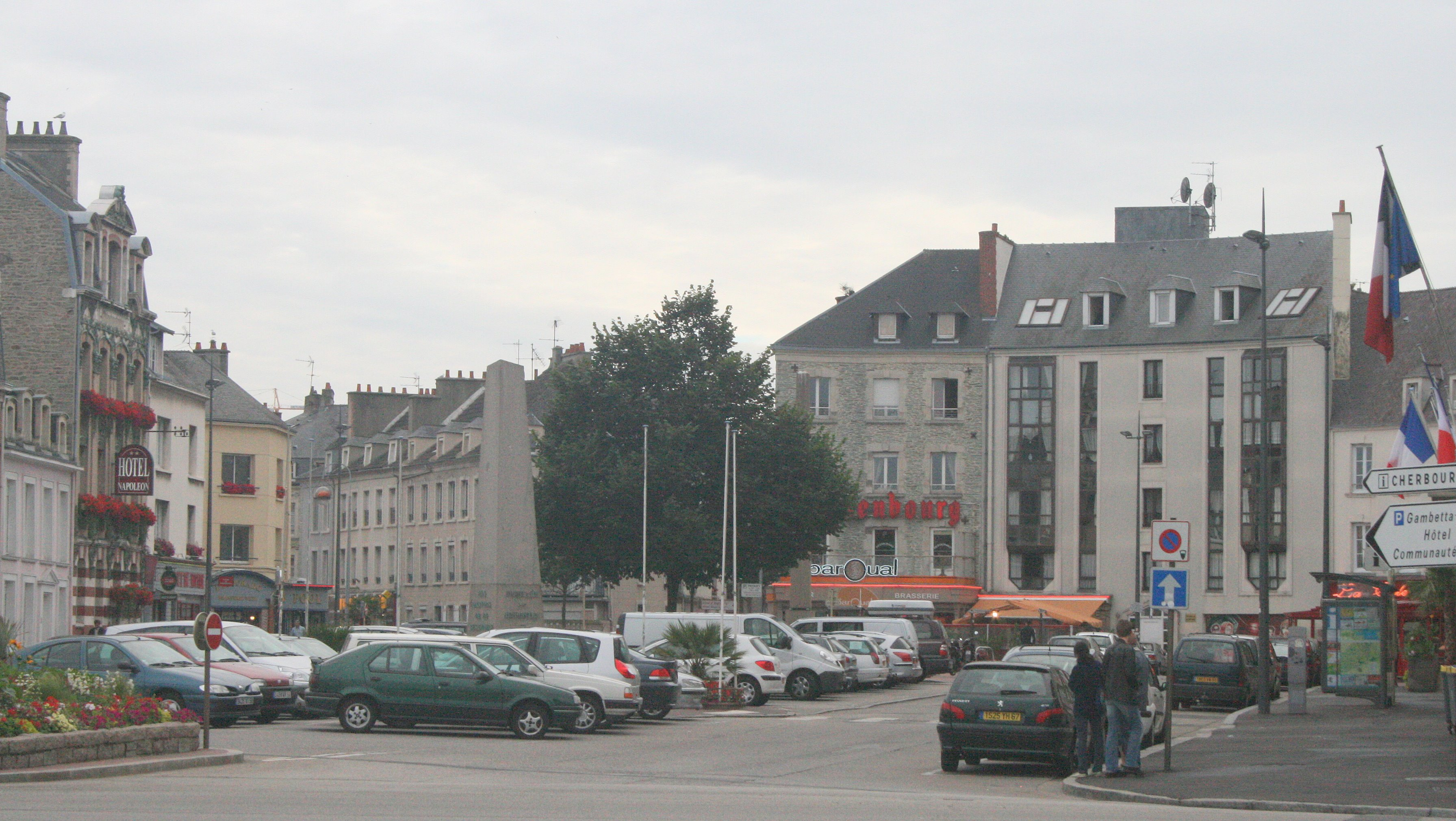
Town centre

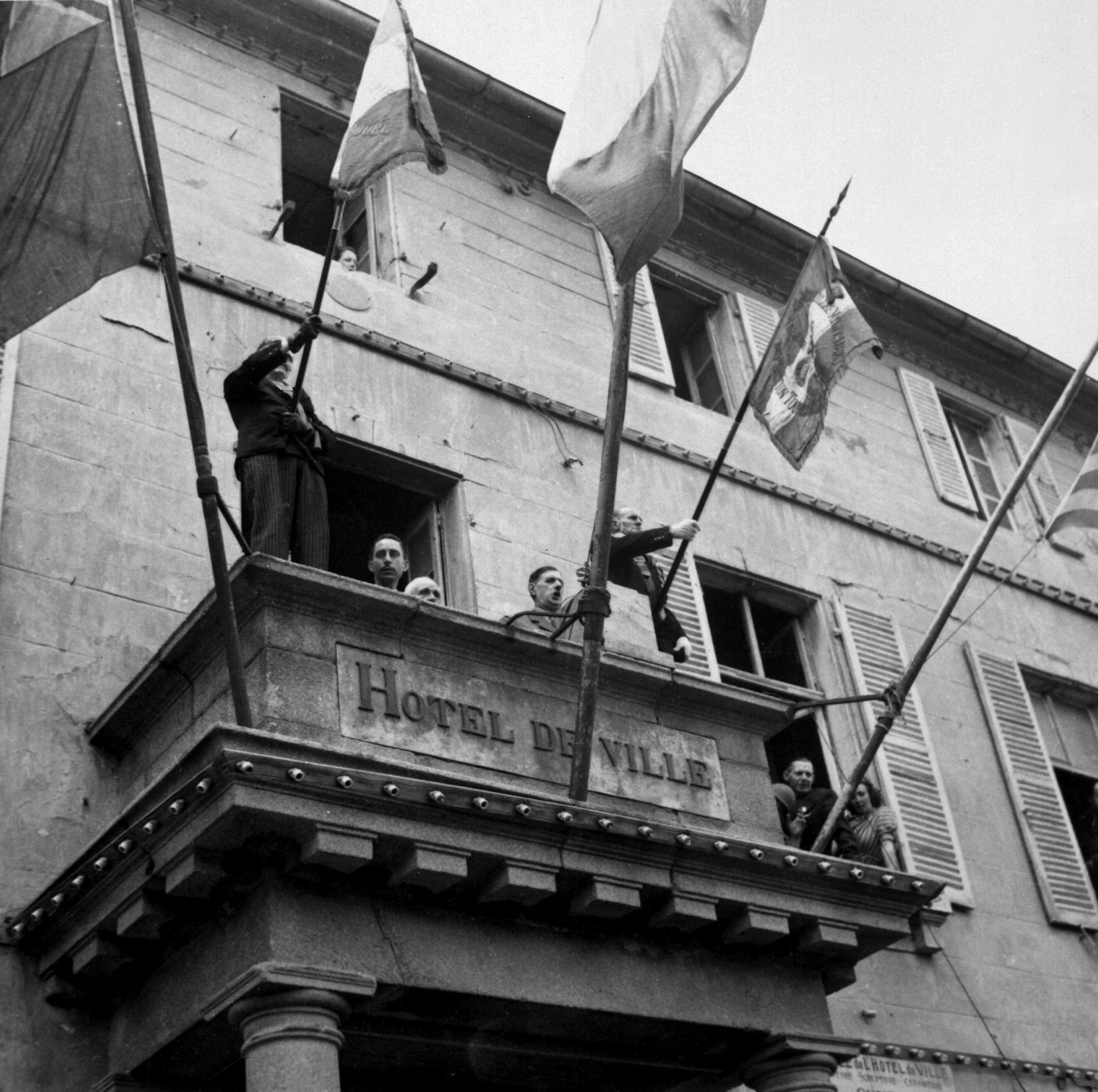
Charles de Gaulle delivering a speech in liberated Cherbourg from the Hôtel de Ville (town hall)

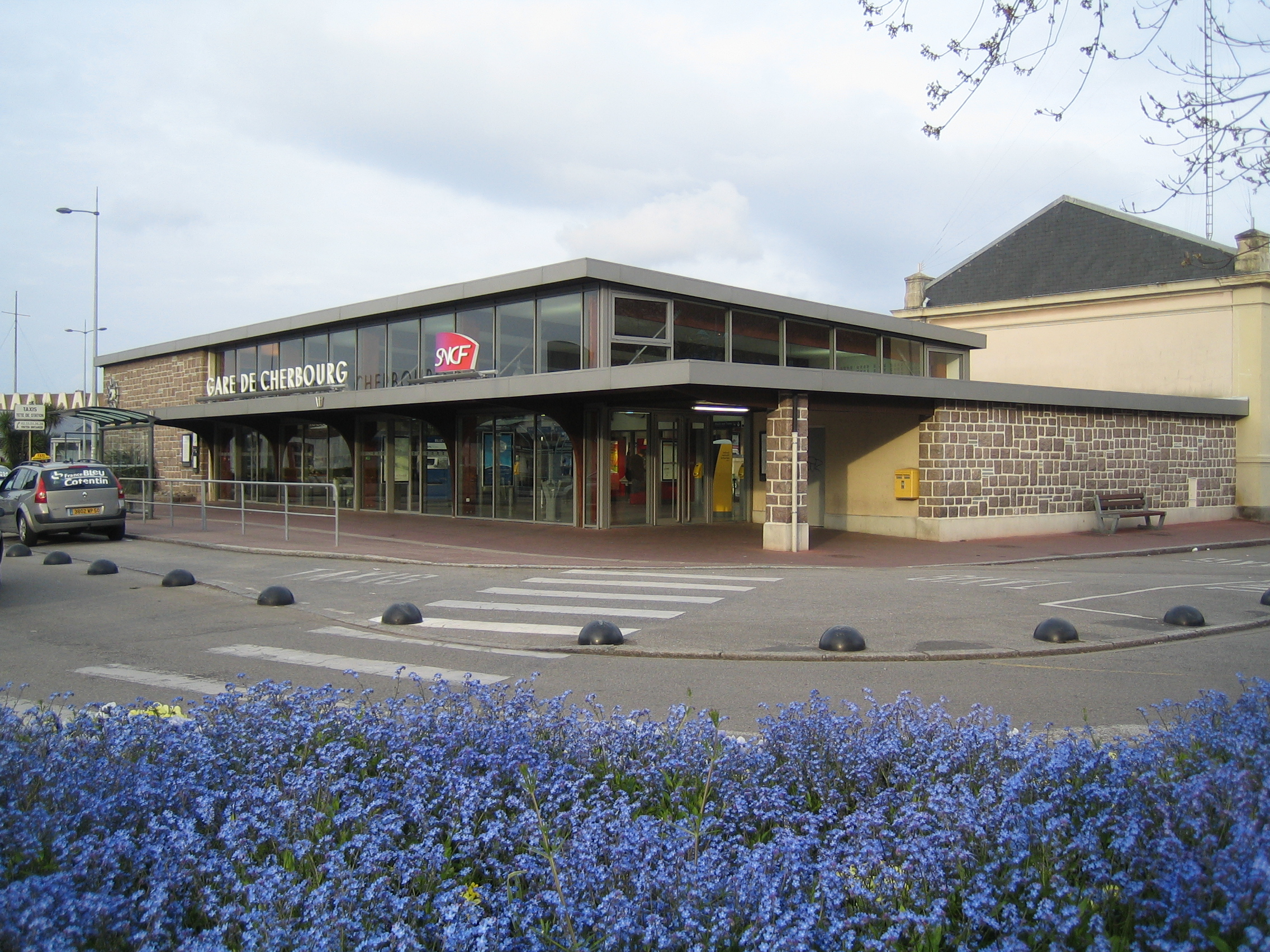
Gare de Cherbourg

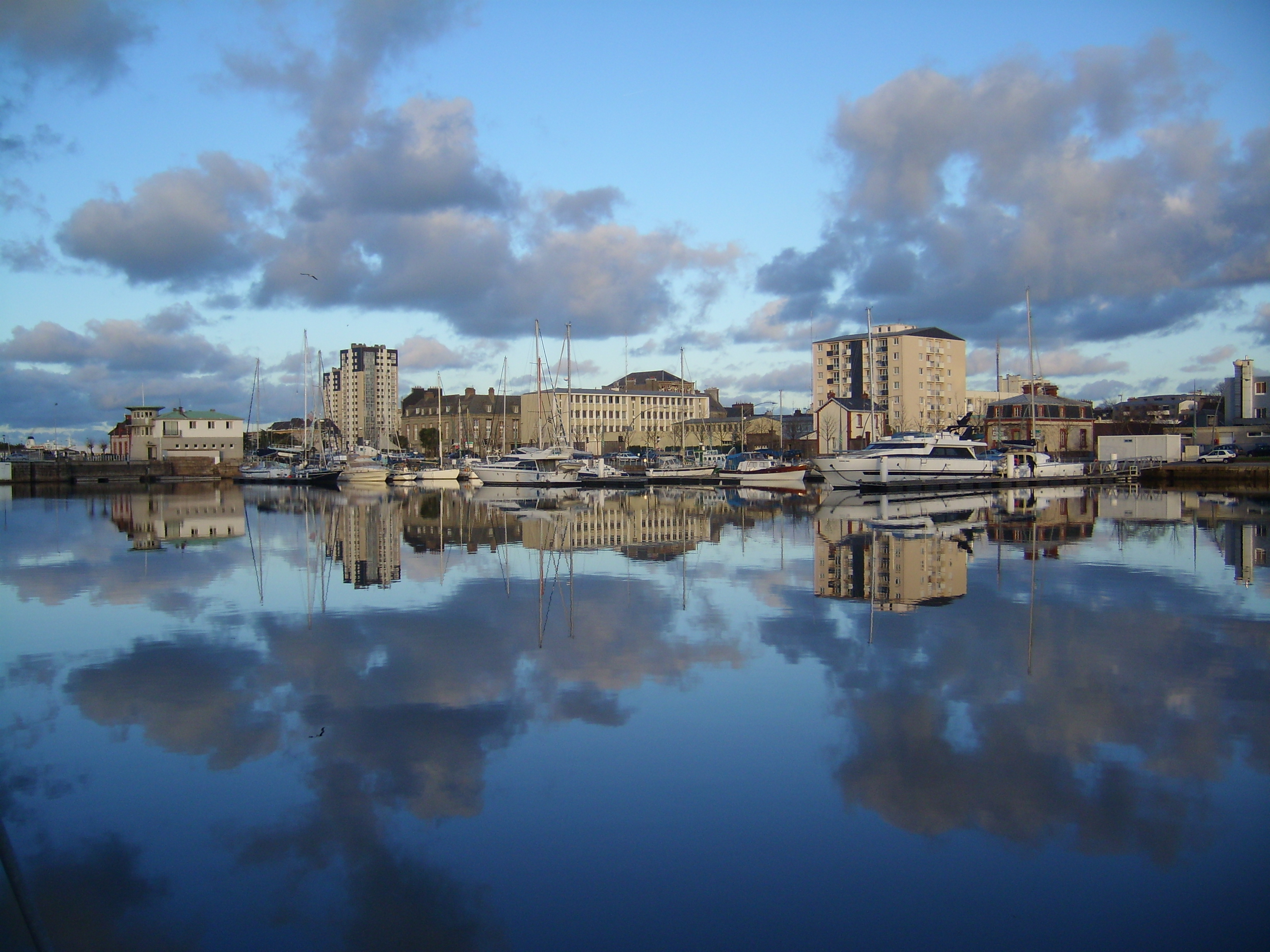
Haven

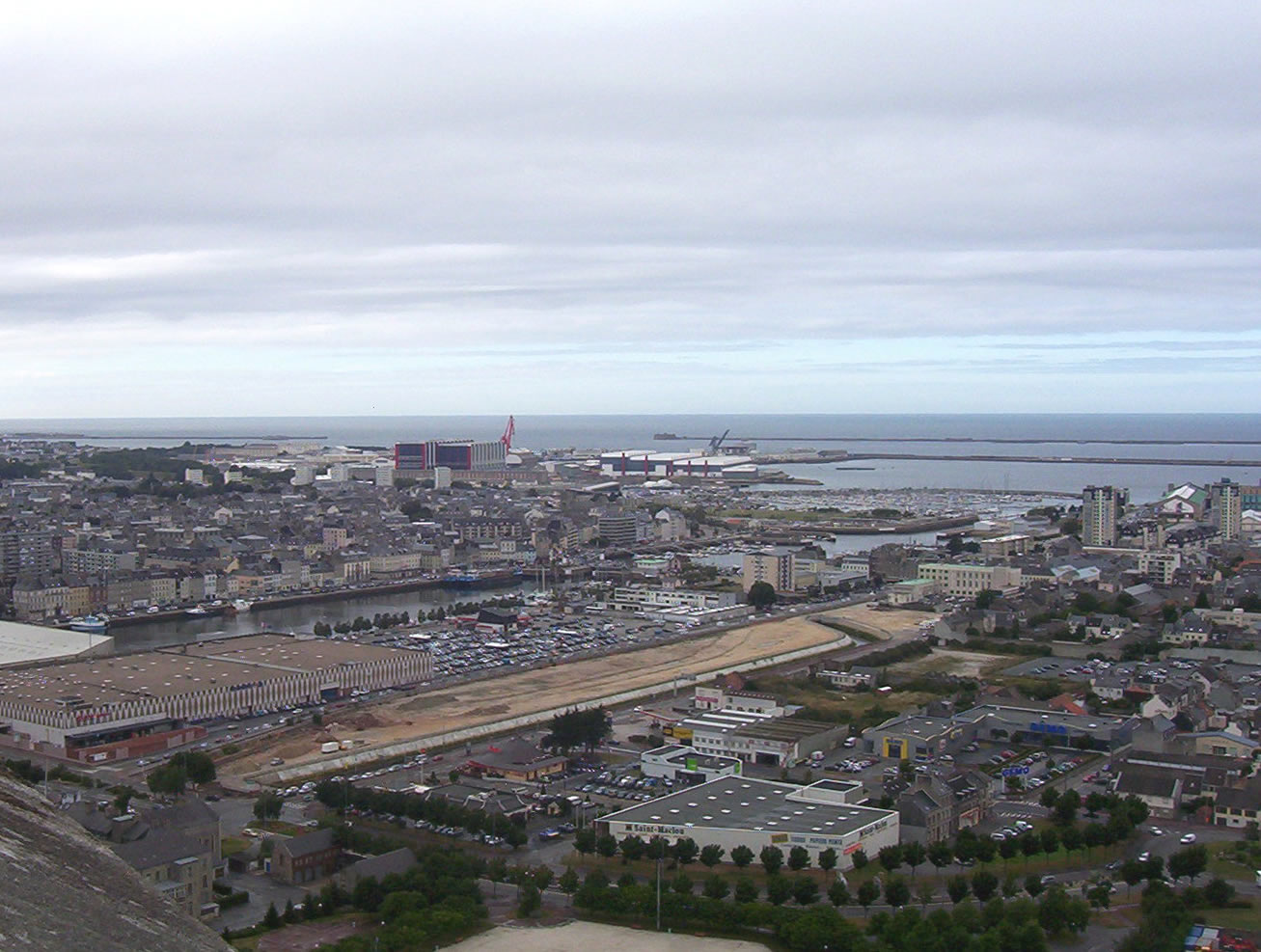
Current view of the city

== See also ==
- History of Cherbourg
- Cherbourg Harbour
- History of the French Navy
- List of submarines built at Cherbourg
- List of maritime prefects of Cherbourg
- Gare de Cherbourg
- Gare Maritime de Cherbourg
- Battle of Cherbourg, 1944
- Cité de la Mer
- Les Parapluies de Cherbourg (The Umbrellas of Cherbourg), a musical film
- Demoiselles de Cherbourg
- Severodvinsk
- Groton

== Bibliography ==
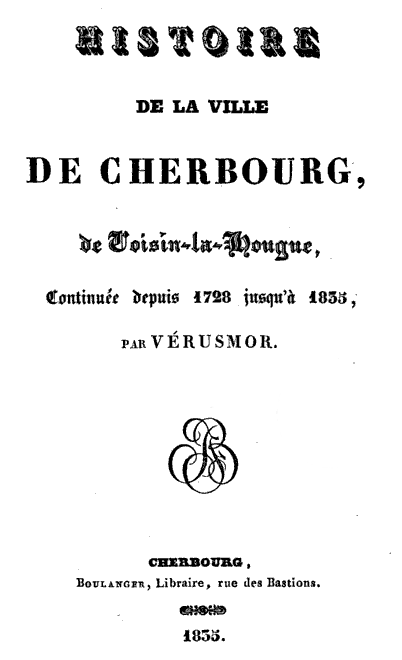
History of the city of Cherbourg, by Voisin La Hougue, continued from 1728 until 1835 by Vérusmor (1835)

Published in the 19th century

- Mémoires de la Société nationale académique de Cherbourg [Memoirs of the national academic society of Cherbourg] (in French), 1833-1995
- de Berruyer (1833). Guide du voyageur à Cherbourg [A traveller's guide to Cherbourg] (in French). Cherbourg: Boulanger.
- Voisin La Hougue (1835). Histoire de la ville de Cherbourg (continuée depuis 1728 jusqu'à 1835 par Vérusmor) [History of the city of Cherbourg (continued from 1728 until 1835 by Vérusmor)] (in French). Cherbourg: Boulanger.
- de Tocqueville, Alexis (1848). Notice sur Cherbourg [Notice on Cherbourg] (in French). Paris: Furne et Cie.
- "Cherbourg", A Handbook for Travellers in France, London: John Murray, 1861, OL 24627024M
- Pelloquet, Th. (1866). Cherbourg et ses bains de mer [Cherbourg and its sea baths] (in French). mprimerie Vallée, Paris.
- Liais, Eugène (1871). Cherbourg, la ville, son port et son commerce [Cherbourg, the city, its port and its trade] (in French). Mouchel.
- C.B. Black (1876), "Cherbourg", Guide to the North of France, Edinburgh: Adam and Charles Black
- Bertin, Émile (1879). Fondation de l'ancien Port de Cherbourg (notes et plans) [Foundation of the old Port of Cherbourg (notes and plans)] (in French). Paris: Dunod.
- Leroy, Abbé (1885). Le Vieux Cherbourg [The old Cherbourg] (in French). Mouchel.
- "Cherbourg", Northern France, Leipsic: Karl Baedeker, 1899, OCLC 2229516, OL 24872324M

Published in the 20th century

- Cherbourg et le Cotentin [Cherbourg and the Cotentin] (in French). Cherbourg: imprimerie Émile Le Maout. 1905.
- "Cherbourg" . Encyclopædia Britannica. Vol. 6 (11th ed.). 1911. p. 82.
- Avoine, Émile (1927). Histoire de Cherbourg [History of Cherbourg] (in French). Cherbourg: Périgault.
- Quoniam, C. Th. (1933). Le Port de Cherbourg [The Port of Cherbourg] (in French). Cherbourg: Imprimerie centrale.
- Lefèvre, Raymond (1941). L'Histoire anecdotique de Cherbourg à l'intention de nos écoliers [The anecdotal history of Cherbourg for our school children] (in French). Cherbourg: herbourg-Éclair.
- Lefèvre, Raymond (1946). La libération de Cherbourg (26 juin 1944) [The Liberation of Cherbourg (26 June 1944)] (in French). Cherbourg: Imprimerie commerciale.
- Contre-amiral Lepotier (1972). Cherbourg, port de la Libération [Cherbourg, Port of the Liberation] (in French). Paris: éditions France-Empire.
- Henrot-Brouhon, Thérèse (1975). Cherbourg à la Belle époque [Cherbourg to the Belle époque] (in French). Bruxelles: éditions SPRL Sodim.
- Launey, Bernard (1976). Cherbourg 1900-1975 [Cherbourg 1900-1975] (in French). Cherbourg: Imprimerie La Dépêche.
- Masson d’Autume, Madeleine. Cherbourg pendant la guerre de Cent ans (de 1354 à 1450) [Cherbourg during the Hundred Years' War (from 1354 to 1450)] (in French). Saint-Lô: imprimerie Jacqueline.
- Demangeon, A.; Fortier, B. (1978). Les Vaisseaux et les villes [Vessels and cities] (in French). Liège: Mardaga.
- Ingouf, Paul; Greneville, R. (1979). La bataille de Cherbourg [The Battle of Cherbourg] (in French). éditions Heimdal.
- Le Jeune, Jean (1981). Documents historiques sur le Vieux Cherbourg et sa région [Historical documents on old Cherbourg and its region] (in French). Cherbourg: éditions La Dépêche.
- Picquenot, André (1983). Cherbourg sous l'occupation [Cherbourg under the occupation] (in French). Rennes: éditions Ouest-France.
- Letourneur, Guy (1985). Cherbourg… histoire d'une ville et de son peuple [Cherbourg... story of a city and its people] (in French). Cherbourg: Pierre Boulland-La Dépêche.
- Besnier, Michel (1993). Cherbourg [Cherbourg] (in French). coll. Des villes: Champ Vallon. ISBN 978-2-903528-72-0.
- Lecœur, Maurice (2001). Cherbourg au fil du temps [Cherbourg over time] (in French). Cherbourg-Octeville: Isoète. ISBN 978-2-913920-15-6.
- Patard, Frédéric (2004). Une ville, un pays en guerre, Cherbourg et le Haut-Cotentin, novembre 1918-mai 1944 [A city, a country at war, Cherbourg and the Haut-Cotentin, November 1918 – May 1944] (in French). Cherbourg-Octeville: Isoète. ISBN 978-2-913920-35-4.
- Patard, Frédéric; Léonard, Gérard (2007). Le Guide du Promeneur, Cherbourg-Octeville, Équeurdreville-Hainneville, La Glacerie, Querqueville, Tourlaville [The Guide of the Walker, Cherbourg-Octeville, Équeurdreville-Hainneville, La Glacerie, Querqueville, Tourlaville] (in French). Cherbourg-Octeville: Isoète.
- Ramirez de Palacios, Bruno (January 2015). Charles dit le Mauvais, Roi de Navarre, comte d'Evreux, prétendant au trône de France [Charles, known as the Bad, king of Navarre, Count of Evreux, pretender to the throne of France] (in French). Bruno Ramirez de Palacios. ISBN 978-2-9540585-2-8. 530.
