= Canton of Cherbourg-Octeville-Sud-Ouest =

Coordinates: 49°34′56″N 1°38′54″W

Cherbourg-Octeville-Sud-Ouest
- Former canton
- Interactive map of Cherbourg-Octeville-Sud-Ouest
- Country: France
- Region: Normandy
- Department: Manche
- No. of communes: {{{nbcomm}}}
- Disbanded: 2015
- Population (2012): 19,161

The Canton of Cherbourg-Octeville-Sud-Ouest in France was situated in the department of Manche and the region of Basse-Normandie. It had 19,161 inhabitants (2012). It was disbanded following the French canton reorganisation which came into effect in March 2015. Cherbourg-Octeville was its seat.

The canton comprised the following communes:

- Cherbourg-Octeville (partly)
- Couville
- Hardinvast
- Martinvast
- Saint-Martin-le-Gréard
- Tollevast
