= Cantons of the Manche department =

The following is a list of the 27 cantons of the Manche department, in France, following the French canton reorganisation which came into effect in March 2015:

- Agon-Coutainville
- Avranches
- Bréhal
- Bricquebec-en-Cotentin
- Carentan-les-Marais
- Cherbourg-en-Cotentin-1
- Cherbourg-en-Cotentin-2
- Cherbourg-en-Cotentin-3
- Cherbourg-en-Cotentin-4
- Cherbourg-en-Cotentin-5
- Condé-sur-Vire
- Coutances
- Créances
- Granville
- La Hague
- Isigny-le-Buat
- Le Mortainais
- Les Pieux
- Pont-Hébert
- Pontorson
- Quettreville-sur-Sienne
- Saint-Hilaire-du-Harcouët
- Saint-Lô-1
- Saint-Lô-2
- Valognes
- Val-de-Saire
- Villedieu-les-Poêles-Rouffigny
