= André Rouxel =

French politician

Members of Parliament
- In office June 17, 2012 – June 19, 2012

General Councillor of Manche
- In office March 20, 2008 – April 2, 2015

Personal details
- Born: January 17, 1946 (age 80) Bretteville, Manche, France
- Party: PS
- Occupation: Politician, drafter

André Rouxel (born January 17, 1946, in Bretteville, Manche) is a French politician. He was mayor of Tourlaville from 1995 to 2012, and a short-lived deputy for Manche in 2012.

== Biography ==
André Rouxel was born on January 17, 1946. He is an industrial designer by profession.

He joined the Socialist Party in 1974 and began his political career in 1977, when he was elected Tourlaville town councillor on Georges Fatôme's list. Re-elected in 1983, he became deputy mayor in charge of town planning, then first deputy mayor in 1989. In 1995, he succeeded Georges Fatôme as mayor of Tourlaville.

Bernard Cazeneuve's substitute during the 2007 legislative elections, he became a Member of Parliament on June 17, 2012, for two days, when Cazeneuve was appointed to the government. This lasted until the end of the 13th legislature, as the Assembly no longer convened and his constituency, the 5th in Manche, was set to disappear as part of the electoral redistribution.

Elected president of the Cherbourg urban community on June 23, 2012, replacing Bernard Cazeneuve, André Rouxel resigned as mayor of Tourlaville in October. In February 2015, he became honorary mayor.

He was General Councillor for the Manche department, elected in the Tourlaville canton, from 2008 to 2015.
