= Hardinvast =

- Commune
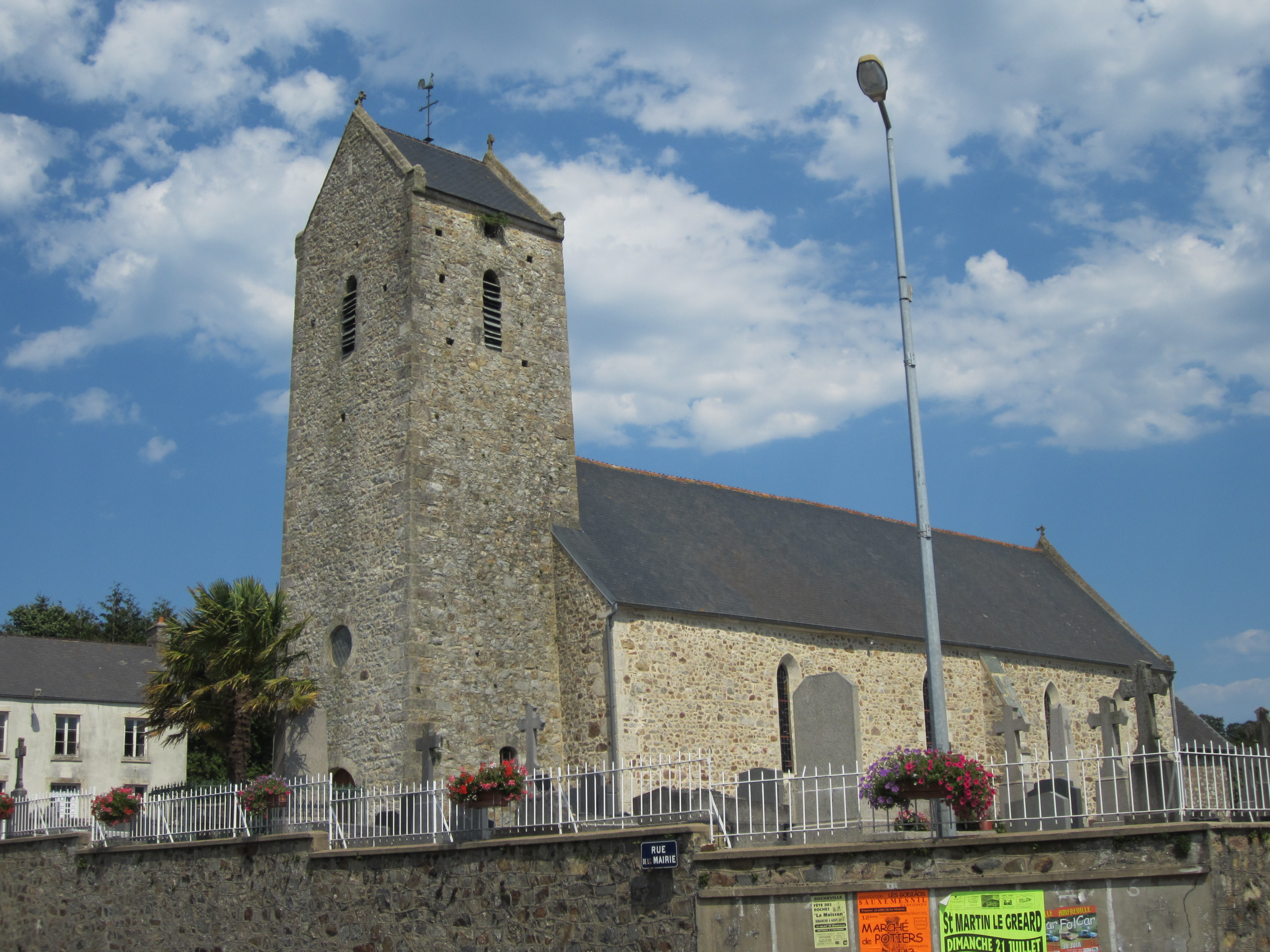
- The church of Saint-Barthélemy
- Location of Hardinvast
- Location within France Location within Normandy
- Coordinates: 49°34′46″N 1°38′48″W
- Country: France
- Region: Normandy
- Department: Manche
- Arrondissement: Cherbourg
- Canton: Cherbourg-en-Cotentin-3
- Intercommunality: CA Cotentin

Government
  - Mayor (2020–2026): Guy Amiot
- Area^{1}: 7.30 km^{2} (2.82 sq mi)
- Elevation: 80 m (260 ft)
- Highest elevation: 172 m (564 ft)
- Lowest elevation: 67 m (220 ft)
- Population (2023): 928
  - Density: 127/km^{2} (329/sq mi)
- Time zone: UTC+01:00 (CET)
  - Summer (DST): UTC+02:00 (CEST)
- INSEE/Postal code: 50230 /50690
- ^{1} French Land Register data, which excludes lakes, ponds, glaciers > 1 km^{2} (0.386 sq mi or 247 acres) and river estuaries.

Hardinvast (French pronunciation: [aʁdɛ̃va]) is a commune in the Manche department in north-western France.

== History ==
Toward the end of the 12th century, Eudes de Sottevast was lord and in charge of the place.

In the Middle Ages, from 1325 an annual fair had place in the village in the "Ferrage" (the shoeing), it was called "la foire aux draps" (the fair of sheets/blankets).

In the village there is an old parish, neighbour of the one in Tollevast, but there is not any trace left of the medieval church, only subsist a few rests from a Merovingian necropolis that has been discovered on the heights of the village and are a testimony of a previous occupation of the place.

The church in Hardinvast is actually quite new, especially if you compare it to the 12th century churches of the nearby towns of Tollevast or Martinvast : the construction of the church began in the 17th century and the bell tower is from the start of the 19th century.

In front of the church, under a Brazilian tree, is the tomb of Emmanuel Liais (1826 - 1900) who was a mayor of Cherbourg from 1884 to 1886 and again from 1892 until his death in 1900, he was buried in Hardinvast because he owned a house here.

During World War 2, the village was a strong place for the German army with launching pads for V1 and V2 missiles, they were destroyed by Allied bombings in 1944.

== See also ==
- Communes of the Manche department
