= Cherbourg-en-Cotentin =

Cherbourg-en-Cotentin Tchidbouo (Norman)
- Subprefecture and commune
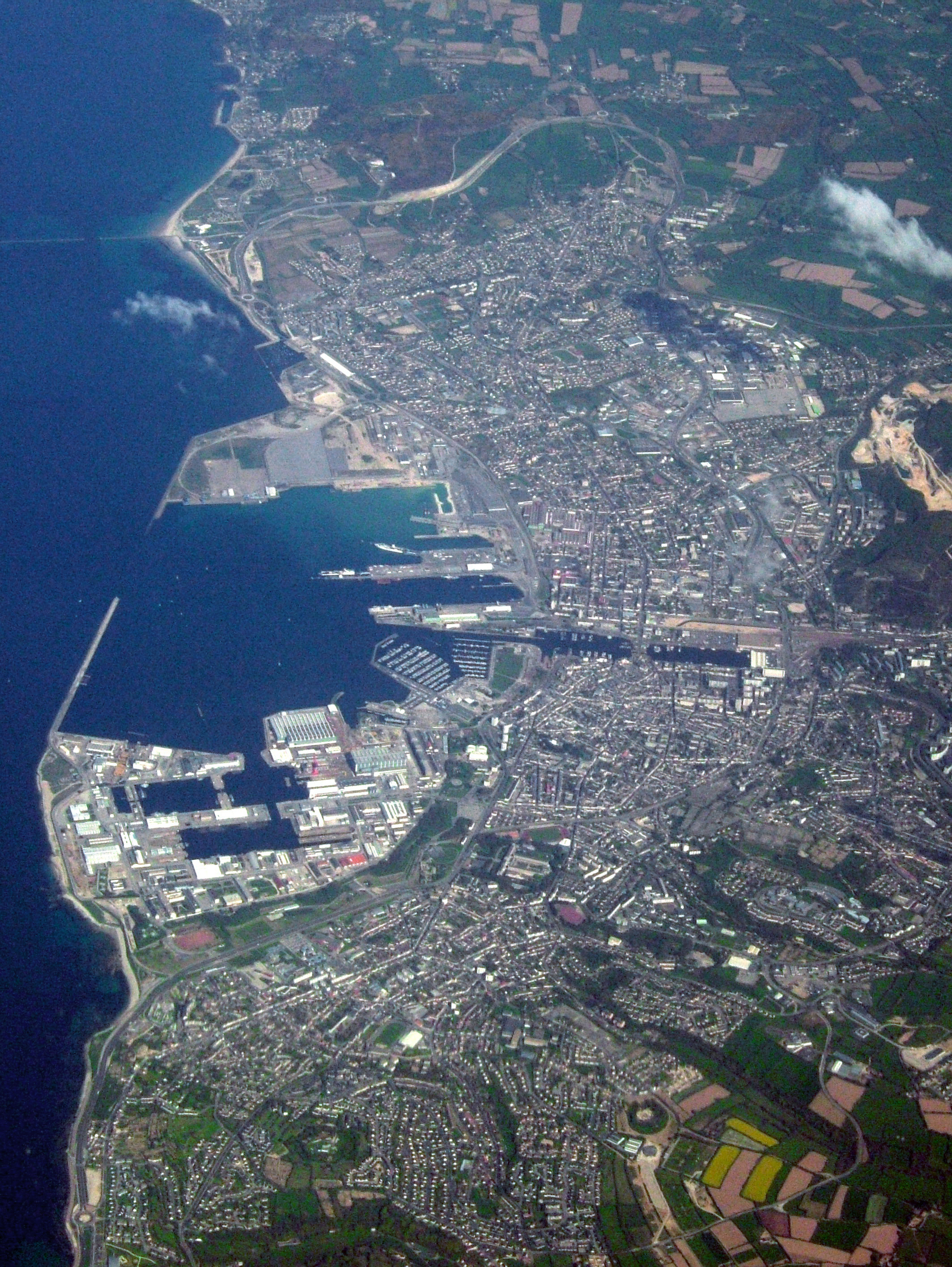
- An aerial view of Cherbourg

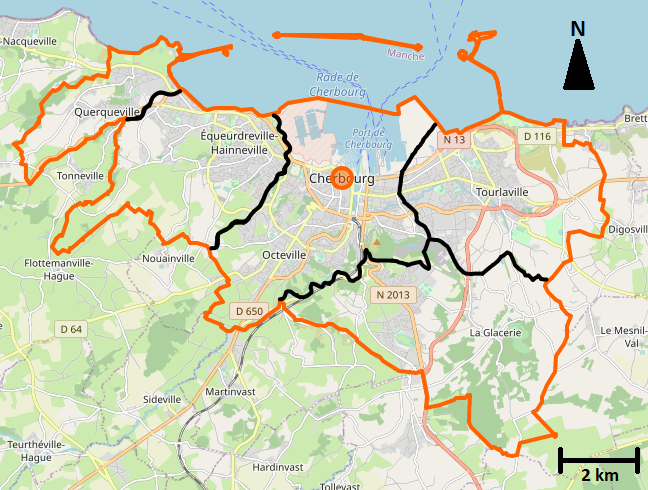
- Location of Cherbourg-en-Cotentin
- Location within France Location within Normandy
- Coordinates: 49°38′20″N 1°37′30″W
- Country: France
- Region: Normandy
- Department: Manche
- Arrondissement: Cherbourg
- Canton: 6 cantons
- Intercommunality: CA Cotentin

Government
  - Mayor (2026–32): Camille Margueritte
- Area^{1}: 68.54 km^{2} (26.46 sq mi)
- Population (2023): 78,258
  - Density: 1,142/km^{2} (2,957/sq mi)
- Demonym: Cherbourgeois
- Time zone: UTC+01:00 (CET)
  - Summer (DST): UTC+02:00 (CEST)
- INSEE/Postal code: 50129 /50100
- Website: www.cherbourg.fr
- ^{1} French Land Register data, which excludes lakes, ponds, glaciers > 1 km^{2} (0.386 sq mi or 247 acres) and river estuaries.

Cherbourg-en-Cotentin (French pronunciation: [ʃɛʁbuʁ ɑ̃ kɔtɑ̃tɛ̃]; lit. 'Cherbourg-in-Cotentin'; Norman: Tchidbouo), commonly known as Cherbourg, is a major port city in the department of Manche, Normandy, northwestern France, established on 1 January 2016. The commune takes its name from Cherbourg, the main town of the commune, and from the Cotentin Peninsula. Cherbourg is an important commercial, ferry and military port on the English Channel.

Cherbourg-en-Cotentin is a maritime prefecture and a subprefecture of Manche. The merger makes it the most populous commune in the department, with 79,144 inhabitants as of 2018 (of which 35,545 in Cherbourg-Octeville) and the largest city of the department, ahead of the Saint-Lô prefecture, and the second-largest city in the region, after Caen. Its urban unit is composed of three communes (Cherbourg-en-Cotentin, Martinvast and Tollevast) and has 81,963 inhabitants (2018). Its larger functional area covers 77 communes and had 152,630 inhabitants as of 2018.

== Toponymy ==
The onomastics of Cherbourg-en-Cotentin are, particularly for the first particle, heavily contested. Theories include descent from Latin, Gallo-Latin, Proto-Germanic, Anglo-Saxon and Old Norse. A medieval folk etymology from *Caesaris burgis ("Caesar's town", from Julius Caesar) is easily discounted.

== Administration ==
The municipality was established on 1 January 2016 by a merger of the former communes of Cherbourg-Octeville, Équeurdreville-Hainneville, La Glacerie, Querqueville and Tourlaville. The seat of the commune is in Cherbourg. Cherbourg-Octeville had been established on 28 February 2000 by merger of the former communes of Cherbourg and Octeville.

Cherbourg-en-Cotentin is part of the arrondissement of Cherbourg, and of 6 cantons: Cherbourg-en-Cotentin-1, Cherbourg-en-Cotentin-2, Cherbourg-en-Cotentin-3, Cherbourg-en-Cotentin-4, Cherbourg-en-Cotentin-5 and La Hague.

== Population ==
Historical population
| Year | Pop. | ±% p.a. |
|---|---|---|
| 1968 | 79,121 | — |
| 1975 | 82,539 | +0.61% |
| 1982 | 85,485 | +0.50% |
| 1990 | 92,045 | +0.93% |
| 1999 | 88,588 | −0.42% |
| 2007 | 85,149 | −0.49% |
| 2012 | 81,103 | −0.97% |
| 2017 | 79,200 | −0.47% |
| 2023 | 78,258 | −0.20% |
Populations of the area corresponding with the commune of Cherbourg-en-Cotentin at 1 January 2025. Source: INSEE

The population of Cherbourg-en-Cotentin is younger than that of Manche, especially the age group 15-39 is larger.

Population by age of Cherbourg-en-Cotentin, 2023 (%)

| 80+ | 6.8 |
| 65–79 | 15.1 |
| 55–64 | 13.7 |
| 40–54 | 18.9 |
| 25–39 | 18.3 |
| 15–24 | 12.2 |
| 0–14 | 15.1 |

Total: 100.1

| male |

| female |

Source: INSEE

Population by age of Manche, 2023 (%)

| 90+ | 8 |
| 75–89 | 18.5 |
| 60–74 | 14.5 |
| 45–59 | 18.4 |
| 30–44 | 15.4 |
| 15–29 | 9.7 |
| 0–14 | 15.4 |

Total: 99.9

| male |

| female |

Source: INSEE

=== Housing ===
In 2017, in Cherbourg-en-Cotentin there were 43,118 dwellings of which 88.8% of primary residences, 3.5% second homes and 7.7% vacant houses. 50.5% were houses and 48.8% were apartments. Of the 37,983 principal residences built before 2015, the largest share (35.7%) was built between 1971 and 1990. 6.6% were built between 2006 and 2014, which is much lower than the departmental rate (11.1%).

The commune shares the social housing with the Communauté d'agglomération du Cotentin. Several HLM agencies are responsible for social housing of the agglomeration: Presqu'île Habitat, Les Cités Cherbourgeoises, HLM du Cotentin, Manche Habitat and HLM Coutances Granville.

== Education ==
Public senior high schools/sixth-form colleges include:

- Lycée Jean-François-Millet (former Cherbourg-Octeville)
- Lycée Victor-Grignard (former Cherbourg-Octeville)
- Lycée Alexis-de-Tocqueville (former Cherbourg-Octeville)

Private senior high schools/sixth-form colleges include:

- Lycée privé Thomas-Hélye (former Cherbourg-Octeville)

== Transport ==
The city is served by Cherbourg–Maupertus Airport. However, there are no schedule flights to and from the airport. The nearest airports are Caen–Carpiquet Airport, located 118 km (73 mi) south east and Rennes - Saint-Jacques Airport, located 241 km (150 mi) south west of Cherbourg-en-Cotentin.

== Climate ==
Climate data for Cherbourg - Maupertus (CER), elevation: 134 m (440 ft) (1991-2020 normals, extremes 1959-present)
| Month | Jan | Feb | Mar | Apr | May | Jun | Jul | Aug | Sep | Oct | Nov | Dec | Year |
|---|---|---|---|---|---|---|---|---|---|---|---|---|---|
| Record high °C (°F) | 14.9 (58.8) | 21.2 (70.2) | 23.7 (74.7) | 23.9 (75.0) | 31.9 (89.4) | 37.0 (98.6) | 33.7 (92.7) | 33.4 (92.1) | 29.4 (84.9) | 27.0 (80.6) | 20.8 (69.4) | 15.9 (60.6) | 37.0 (98.6) |
| Mean daily maximum °C (°F) | 8.2 (46.8) | 8.4 (47.1) | 10.2 (50.4) | 12.5 (54.5) | 15.2 (59.4) | 18.1 (64.6) | 20.0 (68.0) | 20.2 (68.4) | 18.2 (64.8) | 15.1 (59.2) | 11.4 (52.5) | 9.0 (48.2) | 13.9 (57.0) |
| Daily mean °C (°F) | 6.0 (42.8) | 6.0 (42.8) | 7.5 (45.5) | 9.3 (48.7) | 12.0 (53.6) | 14.6 (58.3) | 16.5 (61.7) | 16.8 (62.2) | 15.1 (59.2) | 12.3 (54.1) | 9.0 (48.2) | 6.8 (44.2) | 11.0 (51.8) |
| Mean daily minimum °C (°F) | 3.9 (39.0) | 3.6 (38.5) | 4.8 (40.6) | 6.1 (43.0) | 8.7 (47.7) | 11.2 (52.2) | 13.1 (55.6) | 13.4 (56.1) | 12.0 (53.6) | 9.6 (49.3) | 6.7 (44.1) | 4.6 (40.3) | 8.1 (46.6) |
| Record low °C (°F) | −12.3 (9.9) | −9.9 (14.2) | −4.6 (23.7) | −3.1 (26.4) | 0.1 (32.2) | 2.9 (37.2) | 6.0 (42.8) | 6.3 (43.3) | 3.5 (38.3) | −0.6 (30.9) | −4.0 (24.8) | −8.8 (16.2) | −12.3 (9.9) |
| Average precipitation mm (inches) | 101.7 (4.00) | 75.1 (2.96) | 64.8 (2.55) | 60.4 (2.38) | 56.7 (2.23) | 51.8 (2.04) | 48.5 (1.91) | 62.0 (2.44) | 69.1 (2.72) | 111.5 (4.39) | 113.5 (4.47) | 125.3 (4.93) | 940.4 (37.02) |
| Average precipitation days (≥ 1.0 mm) | 14.7 | 12.0 | 10.9 | 9.8 | 9.4 | 8.4 | 8.2 | 9.1 | 10.0 | 15.2 | 16.2 | 16.3 | 140.2 |
| Mean monthly sunshine hours | 55.8 | 77.6 | 117.3 | 166.5 | 215.8 | 215.9 | 243.1 | 218.0 | 159.1 | 101.3 | 70.9 | 52.8 | 1,694.1 |
Source 1: Meteociel
Source 2: Infoclimat (sunshine hours)

== Politics ==
=== Presidential elections second round ===
| Election | Candidate | Party | % |
|---|---|---|---|
| 2017 | Emmanuel Macron | LREM | 71.43 |
| 2022 | Emmanuel Macron | LREM | 62.99 |

== Sights ==
- The Abbey and Church of Notre-Dame-du-Vœu
- The Basilica of the Holy Trinity
- The Church of Saint-Clément

== Sport ==
Cherbourg-en-Cotentin has two football teams, AS Cherbourg Football who play at stade Maurice-Postaire and the smaller club of FC Équeurdreville-Hainneville who play at Stade Jean Jaurès.

== See also ==
- Cherbourg Harbour
- Communes of the Manche department
