= Nouainville =

- Commune
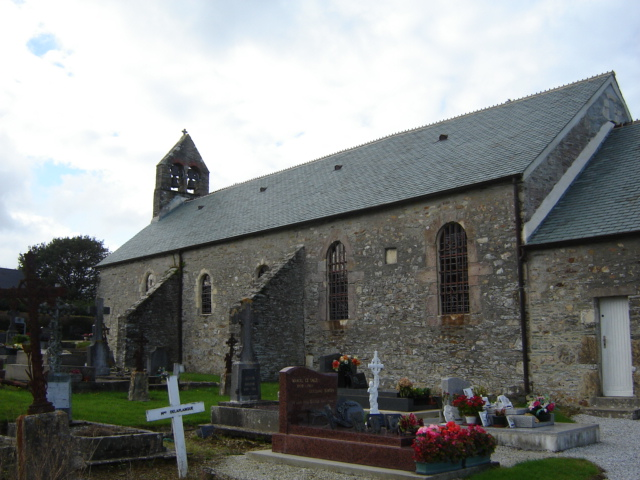
- The roman church of Nouainville
- Location of Nouainville
- Location within France Location within Normandy
- Coordinates: 49°37′29″N 1°40′52″W
- Country: France
- Region: Normandy
- Department: Manche
- Arrondissement: Cherbourg
- Canton: Cherbourg-en-Cotentin-3
- Intercommunality: CA Cotentin

Government
  - Mayor (2020–2026): Jean-Marc Baudry
- Area^{1}: 3.81 km^{2} (1.47 sq mi)
- Elevation: 125 m (410 ft)
- Highest elevation: 150 m (490 ft)
- Lowest elevation: 45 m (148 ft)
- Population (2023): 607
  - Density: 159/km^{2} (413/sq mi)
- Time zone: UTC+01:00 (CET)
  - Summer (DST): UTC+02:00 (CEST)
- INSEE/Postal code: 50382 /50690
- ^{1} French Land Register data, which excludes lakes, ponds, glaciers > 1 km^{2} (0.386 sq mi or 247 acres) and river estuaries.

Nouainville (French pronunciation: [nwɛ̃vil]) is a commune in the Manche department in Normandy in north-western France.

== See also ==
- Communes of the Manche department
