= Sideville =

- Commune
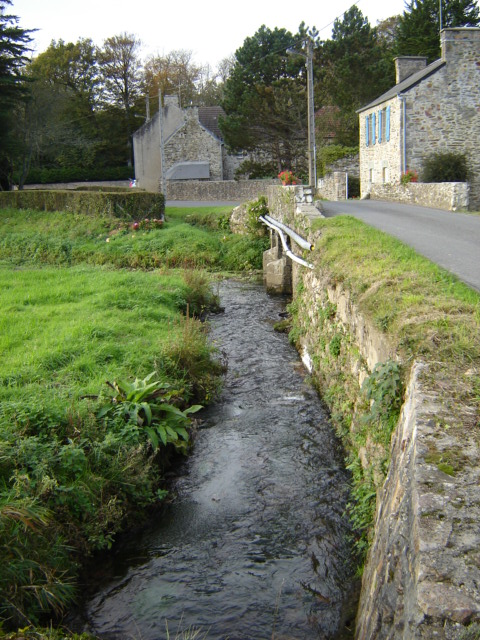
- The Divette River at Sideville
- Location of Sideville
- Location within France Location within Normandy
- Coordinates: 49°35′39″N 1°41′06″W
- Country: France
- Region: Normandy
- Department: Manche
- Arrondissement: Cherbourg
- Canton: Cherbourg-en-Cotentin-3
- Intercommunality: CA Cotentin

Government
  - Mayor (2020–2026): Henri Destrés
- Area^{1}: 7.63 km^{2} (2.95 sq mi)
- Elevation: 30 m (98 ft)
- Highest elevation: 171 m (561 ft)
- Lowest elevation: 18 m (59 ft)
- Population (2023): 856
  - Density: 112/km^{2} (291/sq mi)
- Time zone: UTC+01:00 (CET)
  - Summer (DST): UTC+02:00 (CEST)
- INSEE/Postal code: 50575 /50690
- Website: communedesideville.free.fr
- ^{1} French Land Register data, which excludes lakes, ponds, glaciers > 1 km^{2} (0.386 sq mi or 247 acres) and river estuaries.

Sideville (French pronunciation: [sidvil]) is a commune in the Manche department in Normandy in north-western France.

== See also ==
- Communes of the Manche department
