= Rouxel =

Rouxel may refer to:

- Rouxel (car), a French automobile manufactured from 1899 until 1900
- Gustave Augustin Rouxel (1840–1908), French-born Catholic bishop in the United States
- Guy Rouxel (1926–2016), French footballer
- Jacques Rouxel (1931–2004), French animator, best known for a TV series Les Shadoks
- Philibert Francois Rouxel de Blanchelande, (a.k.a. Philippe François Rouxel) viscount de Blanchelande (1735–1793), the French Governor of Saint-Domingue at the rise of the Haitian Revolution
- Jacques Rouxel de Grancey (1603–1680), Marshal of France
- Jacques Eléonor Rouxel de Grancey (1655–1725), Marshal of France
- André Rouxel (1946–), French politician
