= La Glacerie =

- Part of Cherbourg-en-Cotentin
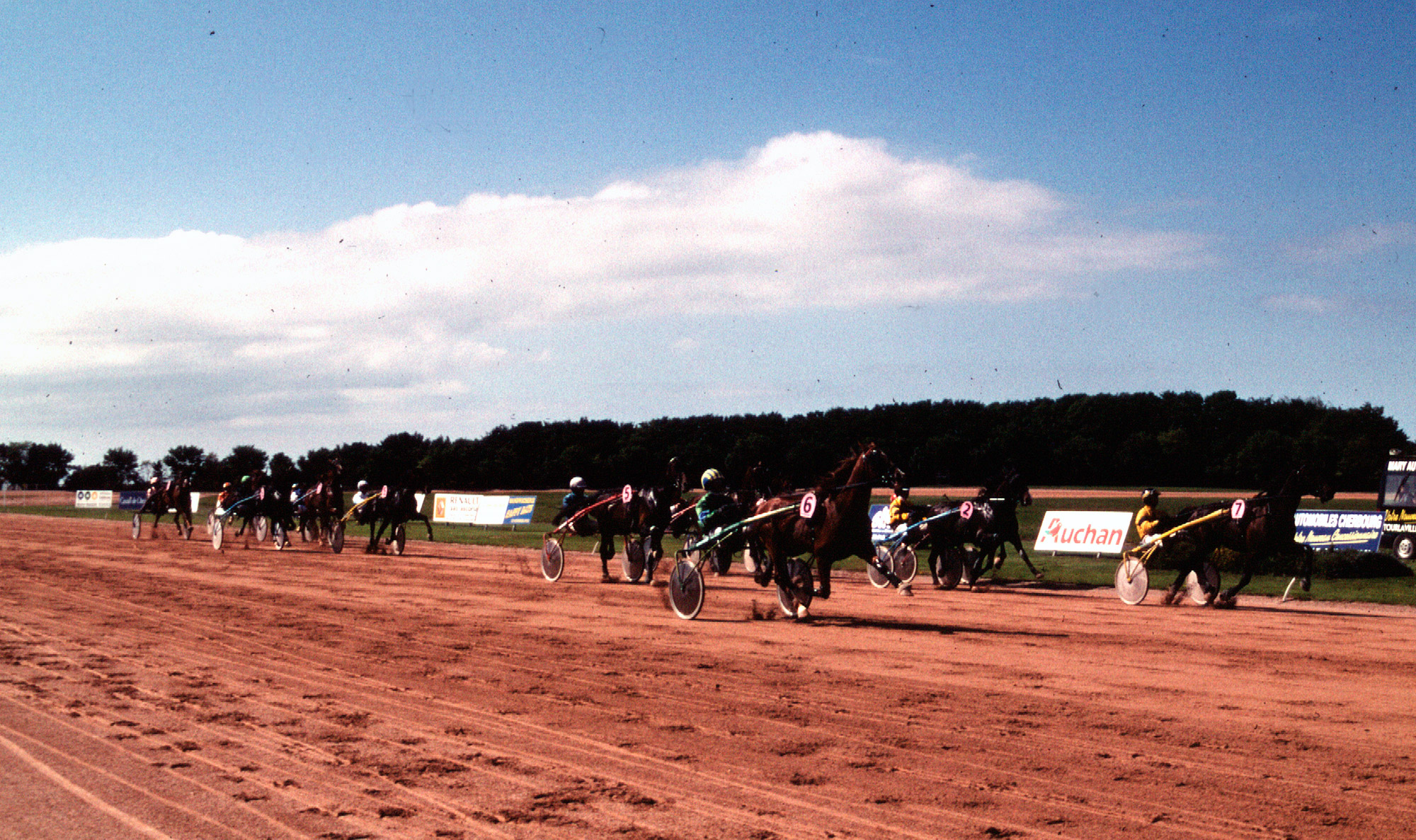
- The racecourse
- Location of La Glacerie
- Location within France Location within Normandy
- Coordinates: 49°36′39″N 1°36′03″W
- Country: France
- Region: Normandy
- Department: Manche
- Arrondissement: Cherbourg
- Canton: Cherbourg-Octeville-2
- Commune: Cherbourg-en-Cotentin
- Area^{1}: 18.7 km^{2} (7.2 sq mi)
- Elevation: 110 m (360 ft)
- Highest elevation: 178 m (584 ft)
- Lowest elevation: 5 m (16 ft)
- Population (2022): 5,882
  - Density: 315/km^{2} (815/sq mi)
- Time zone: UTC+01:00 (CET)
  - Summer (DST): UTC+02:00 (CEST)
- Postal code: 50470
- ^{1} French Land Register data, which excludes lakes, ponds, glaciers > 1 km^{2} (0.386 sq mi or 247 acres) and river estuaries.

La Glacerie (French pronunciation: [la ɡlas(ə)ʁi]) is a former commune in the Manche department in north-western France. On 1 January 2016, it was merged into the new commune of Cherbourg-en-Cotentin.

== Heraldry ==
Arms of La Glacerie	The arms of La Glacerie are blazoned : Azure, a chevron argent charged near the point with a rose gules, between 2 plates fimbriated Or (mirrors) and a belltower argent issuant from a barrulet gules, in chief a fleur de lys Or.

== See also ==
- Communes of the Manche department
