= Teurthéville-Hague =

- Commune
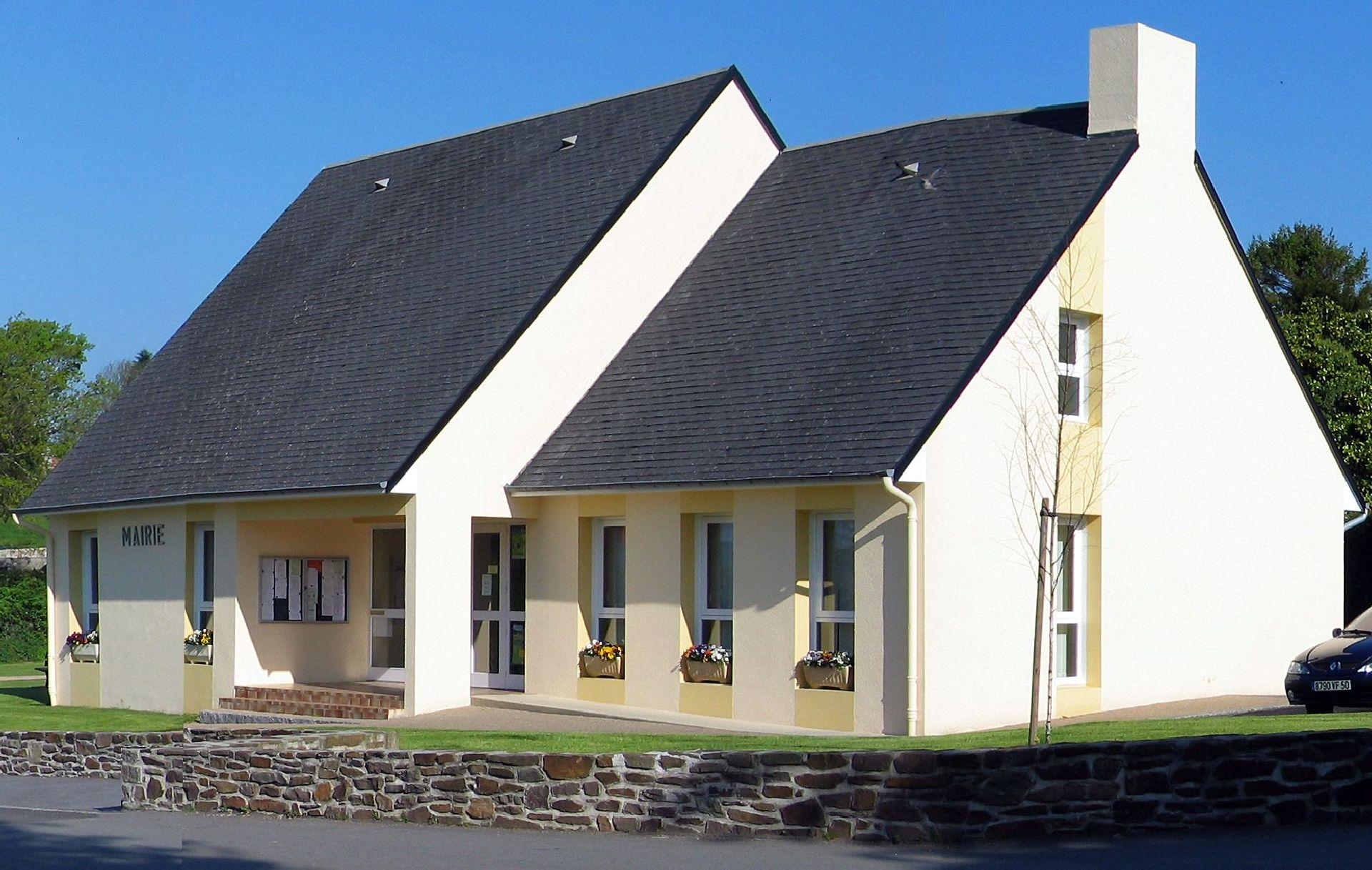
- Town hall
- Location of Teurthéville-Hague
- Location within France Location within Normandy
- Coordinates: 49°35′01″N 1°43′37″W
- Country: France
- Region: Normandy
- Department: Manche
- Arrondissement: Cherbourg
- Canton: Cherbourg-en-Cotentin-3
- Intercommunality: CA Cotentin

Government
  - Mayor (2023–2026): Fabrice Hussenet
- Area^{1}: 12.73 km^{2} (4.92 sq mi)
- Elevation: 45 m (148 ft)
- Highest elevation: 142 m (466 ft)
- Lowest elevation: 32 m (105 ft)
- Population (2023): 1,037
  - Density: 81.46/km^{2} (211.0/sq mi)
- Time zone: UTC+01:00 (CET)
  - Summer (DST): UTC+02:00 (CEST)
- INSEE/Postal code: 50594 /50690
- ^{1} French Land Register data, which excludes lakes, ponds, glaciers > 1 km^{2} (0.386 sq mi or 247 acres) and river estuaries.

Teurthéville-Hague (French pronunciation: [tœʁtevil aɡ]) is a commune in the Manche department in Normandy in north-western France.

== See also ==
- Communes of the Manche department
