= Équeurdreville-Hainneville =

- Delegated commune of Cherbourg-en-Cotentin
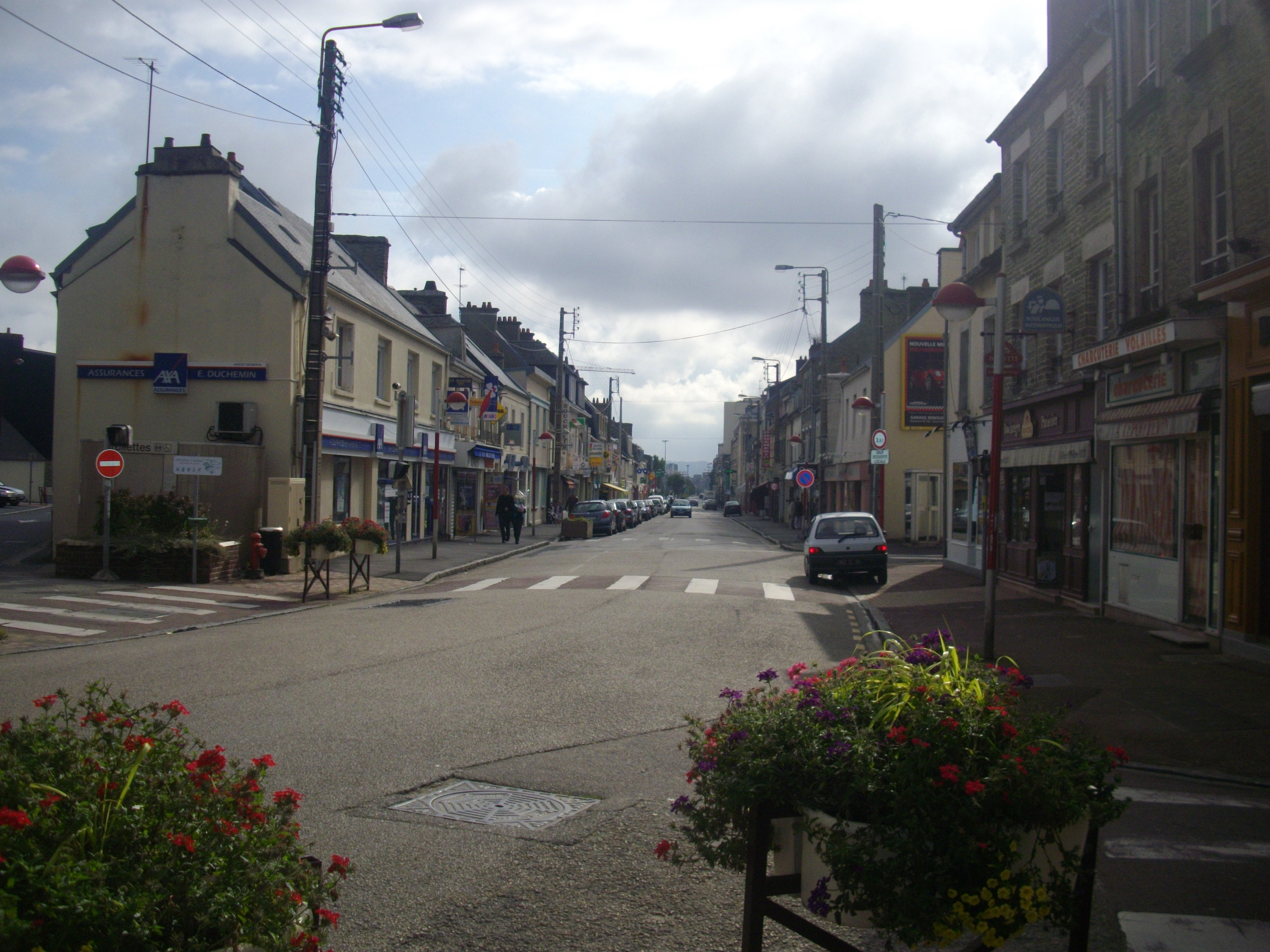
- Location of Équeurdreville-Hainneville
- Location within France Location within Normandy
- Coordinates: 49°38′54″N 1°39′17″W
- Country: France
- Region: Normandy
- Department: Manche
- Arrondissement: Cherbourg
- Canton: Équeurdreville-Hainneville
- Commune: Cherbourg-en-Cotentin
- Area^{1}: 12.83 km^{2} (4.95 sq mi)
- Elevation: 10 m (33 ft)
- Highest elevation: 173 m (568 ft)
- Lowest elevation: 0 m (0 ft)
- Population (2022): 15,772
  - Density: 1,229/km^{2} (3,184/sq mi)
- Time zone: UTC+01:00 (CET)
  - Summer (DST): UTC+02:00 (CEST)
- Postal code: 50120
- ^{1} French Land Register data, which excludes lakes, ponds, glaciers > 1 km^{2} (0.386 sq mi or 247 acres) and river estuaries.

Équeurdreville-Hainneville (French pronunciation: [ekœʁdʁəvil ɛnvil]) is a former commune in the Manche department in Normandy in north-western France. On 1 January 2016, it was merged into the new commune of Cherbourg-en-Cotentin. Its population was 15,772 in 2022.

It was formed when Équeurdreville and Hainneville merged on 1 January 1965.

== Heraldry ==
Arms of Équeurdreville-Hainneville	The arms of Équeurdreville-Hainneville are blazoned : Per fess 1: Per pale A: Azure, in bend 3 escallops Or and B: Gules, a tower Or; 2: Gules, a 4arched bridge Or issuant from a base engrailed (waves) vert.

== See also ==
- Communes of the Manche department
