= André Lemonnier =

French admiral (1896–1963)

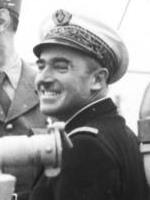
André Lemonnier

André-Georges Lemonnier (born 23 February 1896 in Guingamp; died 30 May 1963 at La Glacerie) was a French admiral.

== Biography ==
He joined in 1913, during the First World War, and served on patrol boats and submarines. In 1929 he attended the School of War, where he was also promoted. He was appointed frigate captain in 1933 and then commanded the destroyer Le Malin.

He was appointed captain of the ship at the beginning of the Second World War. In 1940 and 1941, he commanded the cruiser Georges Leygues, with whom he escaped the British blockade in Gibraltar. He then participated in the fighting in Dakar, in September 1940, against a fleet of Royal Navy ships. He then returned to Algiers where he joined the Allies after the American landing in North Africa of 8 November 1942.

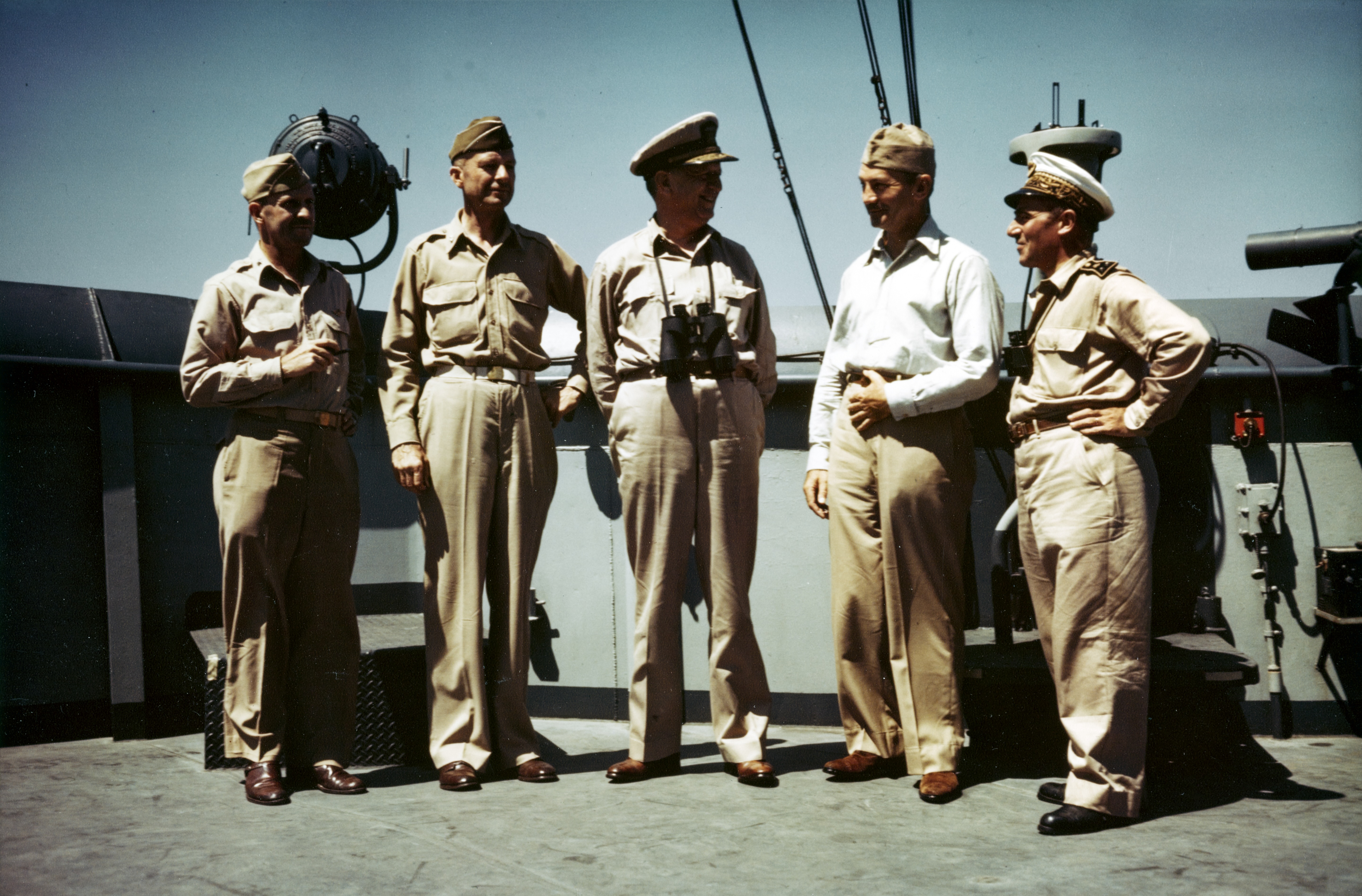
Senior officers aboard USS Catoctin (AGC-5), operation flagship, en route to the invasion area on August 14, 1944. Left to right: Brigadier General Gordon P. Saville, Air Commander; Lieutenant General Alexander Patch, Army Commander; Vice Admiral Kent Hewitt, Naval Commander; James Forrestal, Secretary of the Navy; Rear Admiral André Lemonnier, Chief of Staff of the French Navy.

After being entrusted with the task of relaunching the activity of the French merchant navy, he was appointed rear admiral in 1943 and, in July that year, Chief of Staff of the French Navy of the Navy of the newly created French Liberation Committee national and, as such, responsible for the fusion of marine Vichy and free French naval Forces.

He contributed to the preparation of the landing of Normandy under the French Army of the Liberation. Initially, the allies envisaged the participation of only a few light French units. Rear-Admiral Lemonnier obtained from Admiral Andrew Cunningham the participation in the combat of the two cruisers Montcalm and Georges Leygues. His participation in the landing of free French naval forces took two different forms: certain vessels provided direct support to the assault by their fire, such as the cruiser Montcalm and Georges Leygues or the torpedo-boat La Combattante, or simply by their sacrifice for the establishment of an artificial shelter (scuttling the Courbet).

On the night of 10–11 June, they had a fairly hard engagement against three light vessels off Guernsey. He prepared for the liberation of Corsica and commanded the French squadron during the landing of Provence in August 1944. He was appointed vice-admiral in 1944.

After the war, he retained his position of Chief of Staff of the Navy but also became director of the NATO Defense College. Between 1951 and 1956, he was the "naval deputy" of the commander- in-chief of the allied forces in Europe at SHAPE, the NATO command center in Europe, then installed in the Marly forest in western Paris. His superior in 1951 and 1952 was General Eisenhower Former ally commander of the Second World War and president of the United States. He reached the rank of admiral in 1952. He retired in May 1956.

He died in La Glacerie in 1963. An avenue of the city and another in Marly-le-Roi now bear his name.

== Decorations ==
- Grand Cross of the Legion of Honor
- Purple Heart
- Ordre du Mérite Maritime
- Croix de Guerre 1914–1918 (France)
- Croix de Guerre 1939–1945 (France)
- Legion of Merit
- Order of the Bath
- Order of the Crown (Belgium)
- Croix de guerre (Belgium)

== Artworks ==
- The hundred days of Normandy, ed. France-Empire, 1961
- Cruisers in action, ed. France-Empire, 1959
- Cap on the Provence, ed. France-Empire, 1954
- Peaceful Normandy, ed. The Colombe, 1954

== Bibliography ==
- Etienne Taillemite, Dictionary of French Sailors, Tallandier, 2002, p. 326-327
