= Arrondissements of the Manche department =

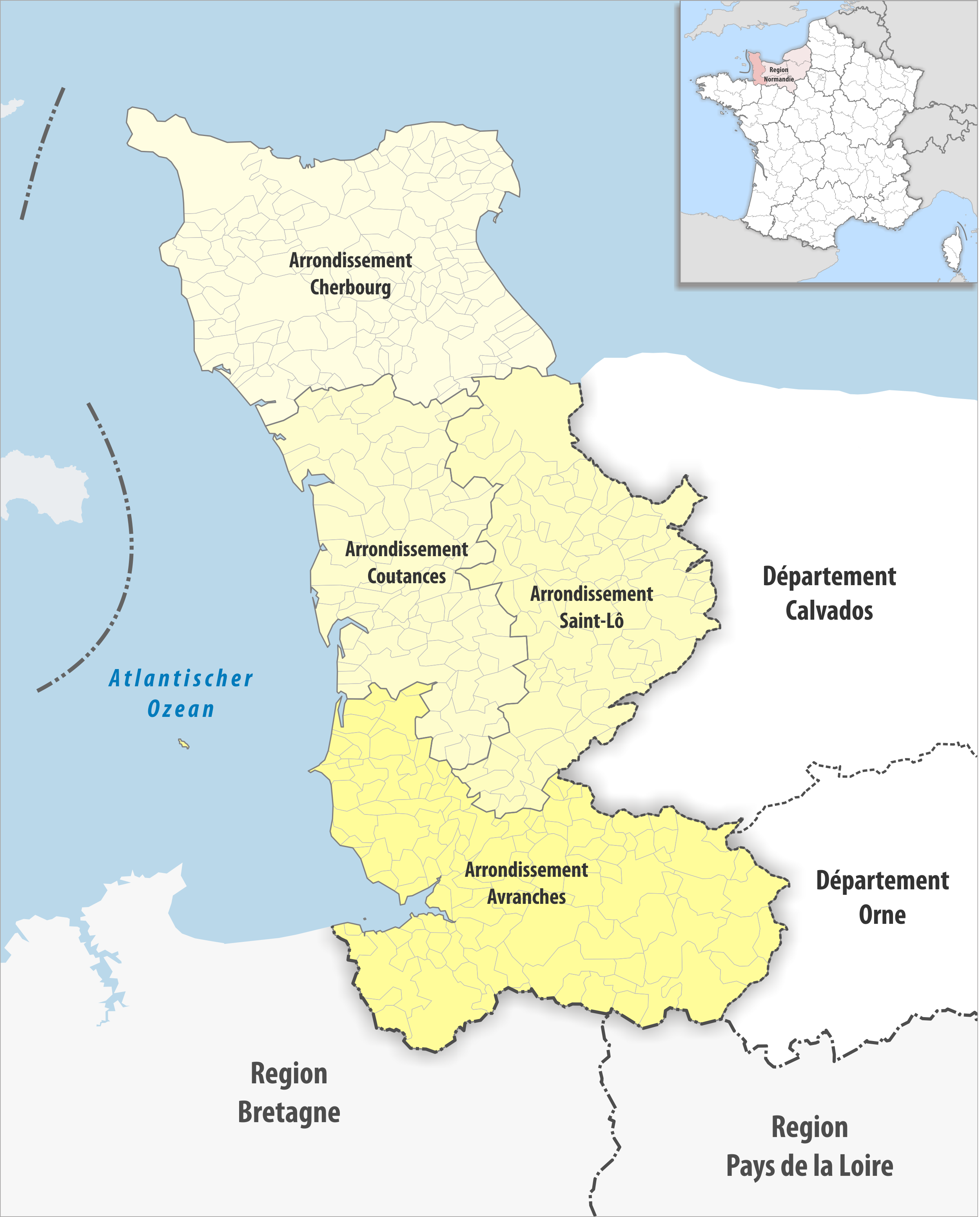
Map of arrondissements of the Manche department.

The 4 arrondissements of the Manche department are:

1. Arrondissement of Avranches, (subprefecture: Avranches) with 134 communes. The population of the arrondissement was 134,499 in 2021.
2. Arrondissement of Cherbourg, (subprefecture: Cherbourg-en-Cotentin) with 144 communes. The population of the arrondissement was 186,735 in 2021.
3. Arrondissement of Coutances, (subprefecture: Coutances) with 80 communes. The population of the arrondissement was 70,454 in 2021.
4. Arrondissement of Saint-Lô, (prefecture of the Manche department: Saint-Lô) with 87 communes. The population of the arrondissement was 103,820 in 2021.

== History ==
In 1800 the arrondissements of Saint-Lô, Avranches, Coutances, Mortain and Valognes were established. The arrondissement of Cherbourg was created in 1811. The arrondissements of Mortain and Valognes were disbanded in 1926.

The borders of the arrondissements of Manche were modified in January 2017:

- 14 communes from the arrondissement of Coutances to the arrondissement of Avranches
- two communes from the arrondissement of Coutances to the arrondissement of Cherbourg
- one commune from the arrondissement of Coutances to the arrondissement of Saint-Lô
- two communes from the arrondissement of Saint-Lô to the arrondissement of Coutances
