= Digosville =

- Commune
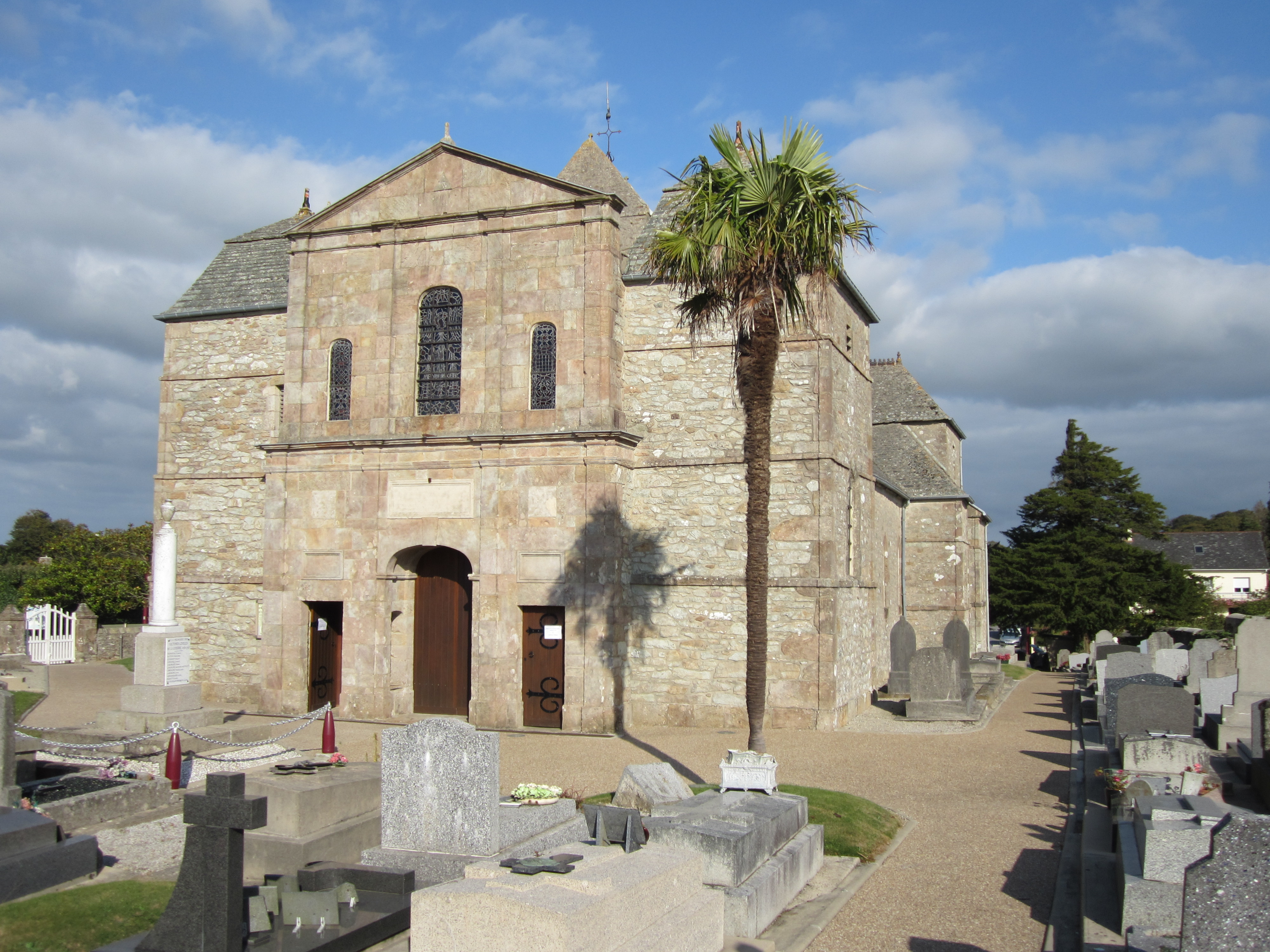
- The church of Notre-Dame with its facade of red porphyry
- Location of Digosville
- Location within France Location within Normandy
- Coordinates: 49°37′54″N 1°31′27″W
- Country: France
- Region: Normandy
- Department: Manche
- Arrondissement: Cherbourg
- Canton: Cherbourg-en-Cotentin-5
- Intercommunality: CA Cotentin

Government
  - Mayor (2020–2026): Serge Martin
- Area^{1}: 9.27 km^{2} (3.58 sq mi)
- Elevation: 80 m (260 ft)
- Highest elevation: 142 m (466 ft)
- Lowest elevation: 0 m (0 ft)
- Population (2023): 1,681
  - Density: 181/km^{2} (470/sq mi)
- Demonym: Digosvillais
- Time zone: UTC+01:00 (CET)
  - Summer (DST): UTC+02:00 (CEST)
- INSEE/Postal code: 50162 /50110
- ^{1} French Land Register data, which excludes lakes, ponds, glaciers > 1 km^{2} (0.386 sq mi or 247 acres) and river estuaries.

Digosville (French pronunciation: [diɡoːvil]) is a commune in the Manche department in north-western France.

== See also ==
- Communes of the Manche department
