= Virandeville =

- Commune
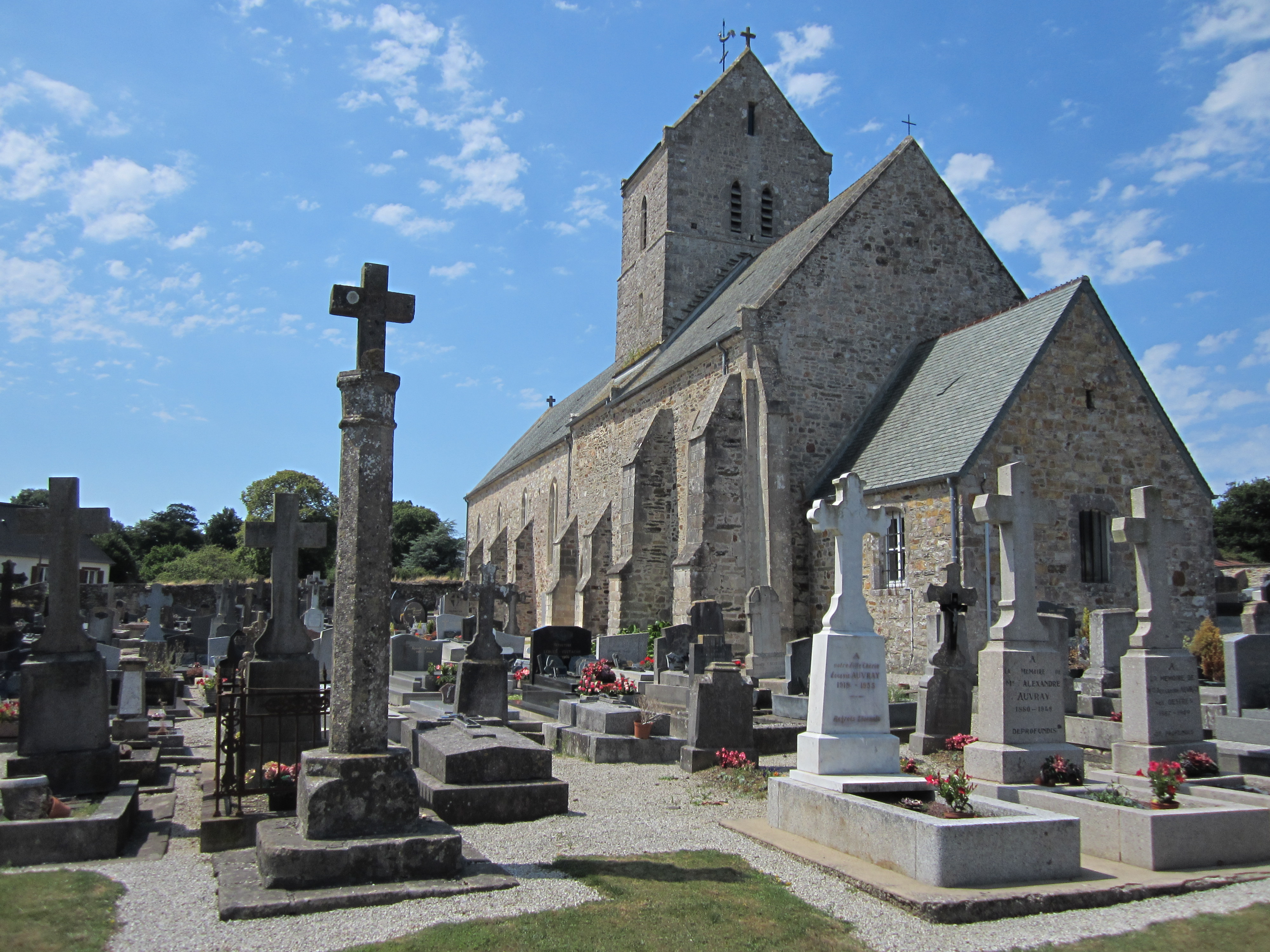
- Saint-Amand church
- Location of Virandeville
- Location within France Location within Normandy
- Coordinates: 49°34′10″N 1°43′30″W
- Country: France
- Region: Normandy
- Department: Manche
- Arrondissement: Cherbourg
- Canton: Cherbourg-en-Cotentin-3
- Intercommunality: CA Cotentin

Government
  - Mayor (2023–2026): Stéphane Olivier
- Area^{1}: 8.22 km^{2} (3.17 sq mi)
- Elevation: 75 m (246 ft)
- Highest elevation: 95 m (312 ft)
- Lowest elevation: 31 m (102 ft)
- Population (2023): 816
  - Density: 99.3/km^{2} (257/sq mi)
- Time zone: UTC+01:00 (CET)
  - Summer (DST): UTC+02:00 (CEST)
- INSEE/Postal code: 50643 /50690
- ^{1} French Land Register data, which excludes lakes, ponds, glaciers > 1 km^{2} (0.386 sq mi or 247 acres) and river estuaries.

Virandeville (French pronunciation: [viʁɑ̃dvil]) is a commune in the Manche department in Normandy in north-western France.

== See also ==
- Communes of the Manche department
