= Tourlaville =

- Part of Cherbourg-en-Cotentin
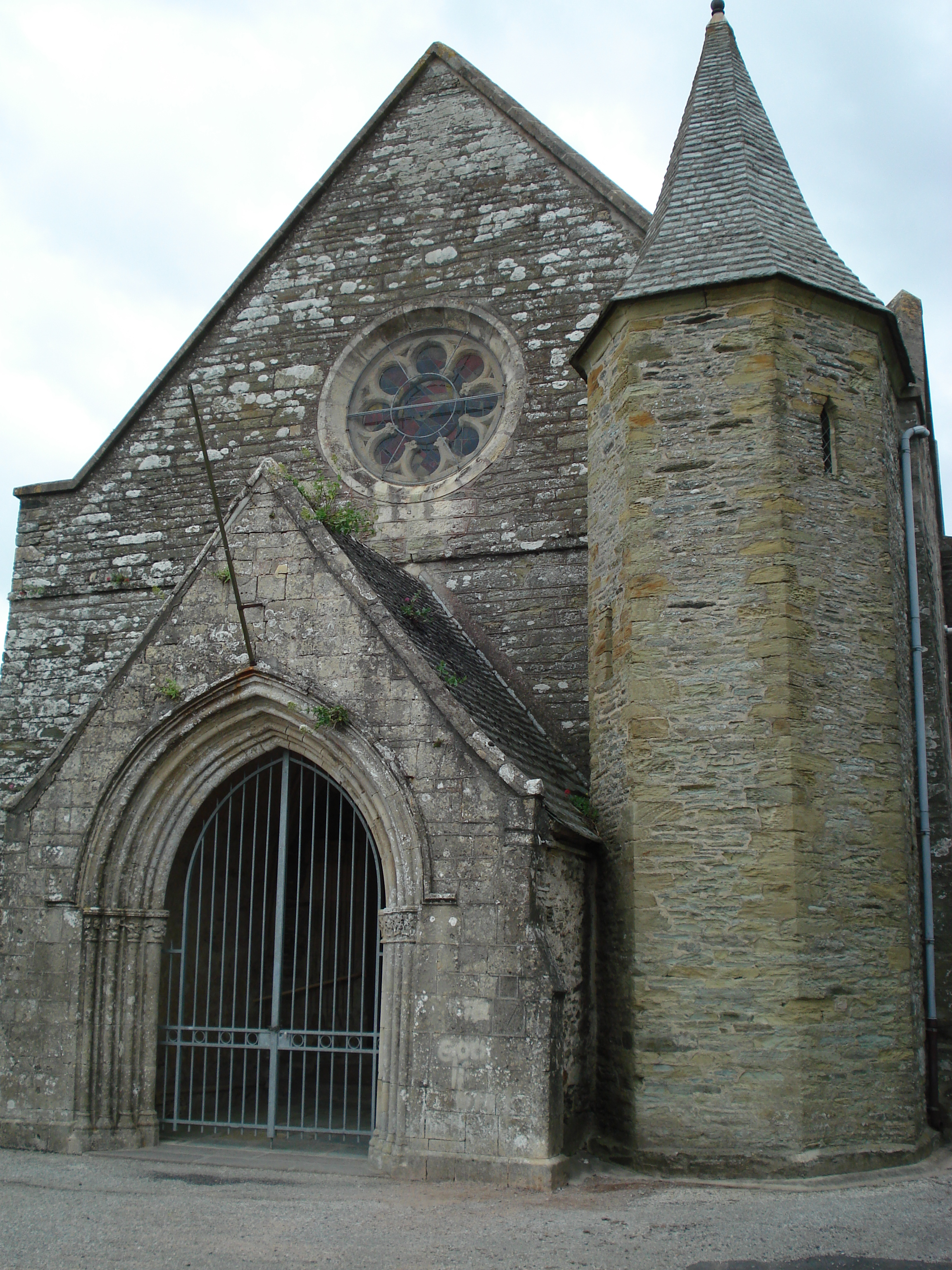
- The church of Notre-Dame
- Location of Tourlaville
- Location within France Location within Normandy
- Coordinates: 49°38′30″N 1°34′39″W
- Country: France
- Region: Normandy
- Department: Manche
- Arrondissement: Cherbourg
- Canton: Tourlaville
- Commune: Cherbourg-en-Cotentin
- Area^{1}: 17.19 km^{2} (6.64 sq mi)
- Elevation: 127 m (417 ft)
- Highest elevation: 132 m (433 ft)
- Lowest elevation: 0 m (0 ft)
- Population (2022): 15,965
  - Density: 928.7/km^{2} (2,405/sq mi)
- Time zone: UTC+01:00 (CET)
  - Summer (DST): UTC+02:00 (CEST)
- Postal code: 50110
- ^{1} French Land Register data, which excludes lakes, ponds, glaciers > 1 km^{2} (0.386 sq mi or 247 acres) and river estuaries.

Tourlaville (French pronunciation: [tuʁlavil]) is a former commune in the Manche department in Normandy in north-western France. On 1 January 2016, it was merged into the new commune of Cherbourg-en-Cotentin. In the early modern era, the lords of Tourlaville were the de Ravalet family.

== Heraldry ==
Arms of Tourlaville	The arms of Tourlaville are blazoned : Azure, a tower argent, overall a chevron or.

== See also ==
- Communes of the Manche department
