= Canton of Cherbourg-en-Cotentin-4 =

Coordinates: 49.65°N 1.66°W

The canton of Cherbourg-en-Cotentin-4 (before March 2020: canton of Équeurdreville-Hainneville) is an administrative division of the Manche department, northwestern France. Its borders were modified at the French canton reorganisation which came into effect in March 2015. Its seat is in Cherbourg-en-Cotentin.

It consists of the following communes:

1. Cherbourg-en-Cotentin (partly: Équeurdreville-Hainneville)
