= Saint-Martin-le-Gréard =

- Commune
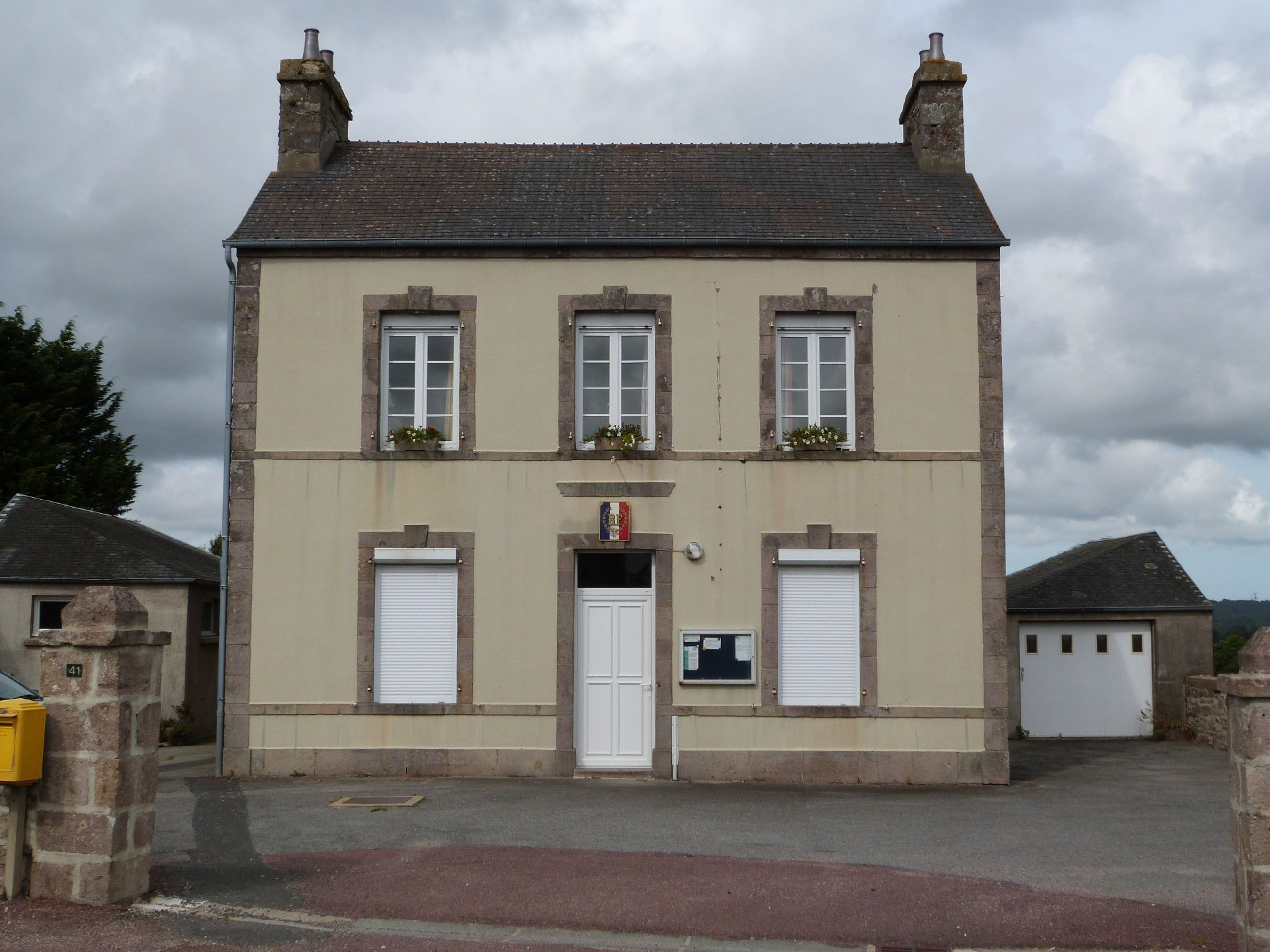
- The town hall
- Location of Saint-Martin-le-Gréard
- Location within France Location within Normandy
- Coordinates: 49°33′29″N 1°38′59″W
- Country: France
- Region: Normandy
- Department: Manche
- Arrondissement: Cherbourg
- Canton: Cherbourg-en-Cotentin-3
- Intercommunality: CA Cotentin

Government
  - Mayor (2020–2026): Nicolas Dubost
- Area^{1}: 2.86 km^{2} (1.10 sq mi)
- Elevation: 112 m (367 ft)
- Highest elevation: 126 m (413 ft)
- Lowest elevation: 62 m (203 ft)
- Population (2023): 606
  - Density: 212/km^{2} (549/sq mi)
- Time zone: UTC+01:00 (CET)
  - Summer (DST): UTC+02:00 (CEST)
- INSEE/Postal code: 50519 /50690
- ^{1} French Land Register data, which excludes lakes, ponds, glaciers > 1 km^{2} (0.386 sq mi or 247 acres) and river estuaries.

Saint-Martin-le-Gréard (French pronunciation: [sɛ̃ maʁtɛ̃ lə ɡʁeaʁ]) is a commune in the Manche department in Normandy in north-western France.

== See also ==
- Communes of the Manche department
