= Bretteville, Manche =

Bretteville-en-Saire
- Commune
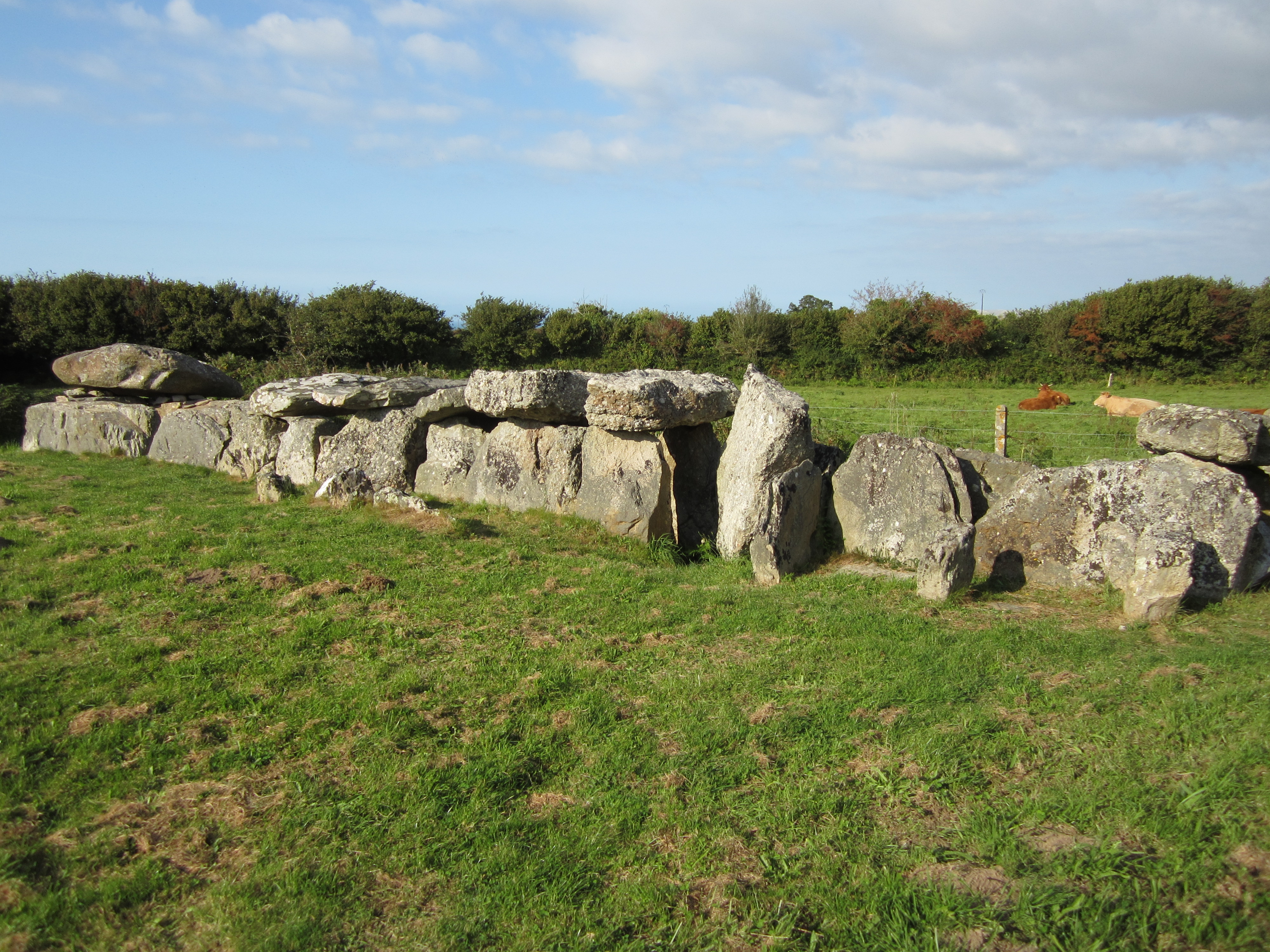
- The covered way
- Location of Bretteville-en-Saire
- Location within France Location within Normandy
- Coordinates: 49°39′25″N 1°31′10″W
- Country: France
- Region: Normandy
- Department: Manche
- Arrondissement: Cherbourg
- Canton: Cherbourg-en-Cotentin-5
- Intercommunality: CA Cotentin

Government
  - Mayor (2020–2026): Jean-Paul Maze
- Area^{1}: 5.78 km^{2} (2.23 sq mi)
- Elevation: 69 m (226 ft)
- Highest elevation: 156 m (512 ft)
- Lowest elevation: 0 m (0 ft)
- Population (2023): 1,027
  - Density: 178/km^{2} (460/sq mi)
- Time zone: UTC+01:00 (CET)
  - Summer (DST): UTC+02:00 (CEST)
- INSEE/Postal code: 50077 /50110
- ^{1} French Land Register data, which excludes lakes, ponds, glaciers > 1 km^{2} (0.386 sq mi or 247 acres) and river estuaries.

Bretteville (French pronunciation: [bʁɛtvil]) is a commune in the Manche department in Normandy in northwestern France.

== Population ==
Historical population
Year	Pop.	±% p.a.
1968	455	—
1975	542	+2.53%
1982	680	+3.29%
1990	1,008	+5.04%
1999	1,075	+0.72%
2007	1,031	−0.52%
2012	1,069	+0.73%
2017	1,074	+0.09%
2023	1,027	−0.74%
Source: INSEE

== See also ==
- Communes of the Manche department
