= Canton of Cherbourg-en-Cotentin-3 =

Coordinates: 49.62°N 1.65°W

The canton of Cherbourg-en-Cotentin-3 (before March 2020: canton of Cherbourg-Octeville-3) is an administrative division of the Manche department, northwestern France. It was created at the French canton reorganisation which came into effect in March 2015. Its seat is in Cherbourg-en-Cotentin.

It consists of the following communes:

1. Cherbourg-en-Cotentin (partly)
2. Couville
3. Hardinvast
4. Martinvast
5. Nouainville
6. Saint-Martin-le-Gréard
7. Sideville
8. Teurthéville-Hague
9. Tollevast
10. Virandeville
