= Cherbourg-Octeville =

Delegated commune in Normandy, France

- Delegated commune of Cherbourg-en-Cotentin
- Location of Cherbourg-Octeville
- Location within France Location within Normandy
- Coordinates: 49°38′N 1°37′W
- Country: France
- Region: Normandy
- Department: Manche
- Arrondissement: Cherbourg
- Canton: 3 cantons
- Commune: Cherbourg-en-Cotentin
- Area^{1}: 14.26 km^{2} (5.51 sq mi)
- Highest elevation: 133 m (436 ft)
- Lowest elevation: 0 m (0 ft)
- Population (2022): 35,452
  - Density: 2,486/km^{2} (6,439/sq mi)
- Time zone: UTC+01:00 (CET)
  - Summer (DST): UTC+02:00 (CEST)
- Postal code: 50120
- ^{1} French Land Register data, which excludes lakes, ponds, glaciers > 1 km^{2} (0.386 sq mi or 247 acres) and river estuaries.

Cherbourg-Octeville (French: [ʃɛʁbuʁ ɔkt(ə)vil]) is a former commune in the Manche department in Normandy in north-western France. It was formed when Cherbourg and Octeville merged on 28 February 2000. On 1 January 2016, it was merged into the new commune of Cherbourg-en-Cotentin, of which it became a delegated commune.

Cherbourg-Octeville is represented by a delegate mayor (Sébastien Fagnen, elected in 2017) and a delegate municipal council.

== Population ==
Historical population
Year	Pop.	±% p.a.
2007	40,288	—
2012	37,121	−1.62%
2017	35,493	−0.89%
2022	35,452	−0.02%
Source: INSEE

== See also ==
- Communes of the Manche department
- The Umbrellas of Cherbourg
- Cherbourg Harbour
- Battle of Cherbourg
