= Canton of Cherbourg-en-Cotentin-2 =

Coordinates: 49.64°N 1.61°W

The canton of Cherbourg-en-Cotentin-2 (before March 2020: canton of Cherbourg-Octeville-2) is an administrative division of the Manche department, northwestern France. It was created at the French canton reorganisation which came into effect in March 2015. Its seat is in Cherbourg-en-Cotentin.

It consists of the following communes:

1. Cherbourg-en-Cotentin (partly)
