= Canton of Cherbourg-en-Cotentin-5 =

Coordinates: 49.64°N 1.58°W

The canton of Cherbourg-en-Cotentin-5 (before March 2020: canton of Tourlaville) is an administrative division of the Manche department, northwestern France. Its borders were modified at the French canton reorganisation which came into effect in March 2015. Its seat is in Cherbourg-en-Cotentin.

It consists of the following communes:

1. Bretteville
2. Cherbourg-en-Cotentin (partly: Tourlaville)
3. Digosville
4. Le Mesnil-au-Val
