= Tollevast =

- Commune
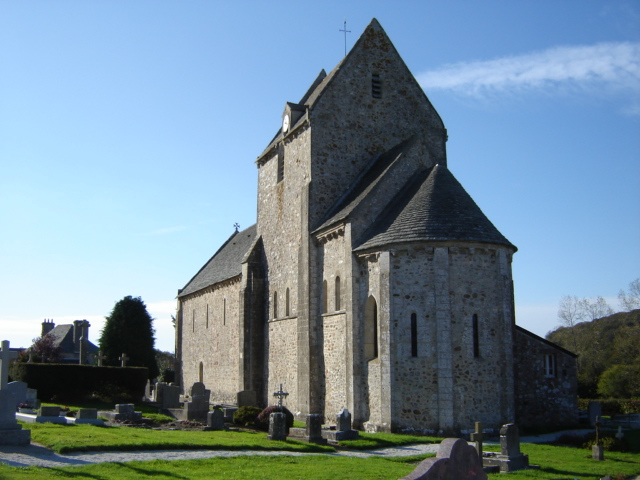
- The church of Saint-Martin
- Location of Tollevast
- Location within France Location within Normandy
- Coordinates: 49°34′32″N 1°37′30″W
- Country: France
- Region: Normandy
- Department: Manche
- Arrondissement: Cherbourg
- Canton: Cherbourg-en-Cotentin-3
- Intercommunality: CA Cotentin

Government
  - Mayor (2020–2026): Stéphane Barbé
- Area^{1}: 12.36 km^{2} (4.77 sq mi)
- Elevation: 80 m (260 ft)
- Highest elevation: 176 m (577 ft)
- Lowest elevation: 68 m (223 ft)
- Population (2023): 1,654
  - Density: 133.8/km^{2} (346.6/sq mi)
- Time zone: UTC+01:00 (CET)
  - Summer (DST): UTC+02:00 (CEST)
- INSEE/Postal code: 50599 /50470
- ^{1} French Land Register data, which excludes lakes, ponds, glaciers > 1 km^{2} (0.386 sq mi or 247 acres) and river estuaries.

Tollevast (French pronunciation: [tɔlva]) is a commune in the Manche department in Normandy in north-western France.

== See also ==
- Communes of the Manche department
