= Martinvast =

- Commune
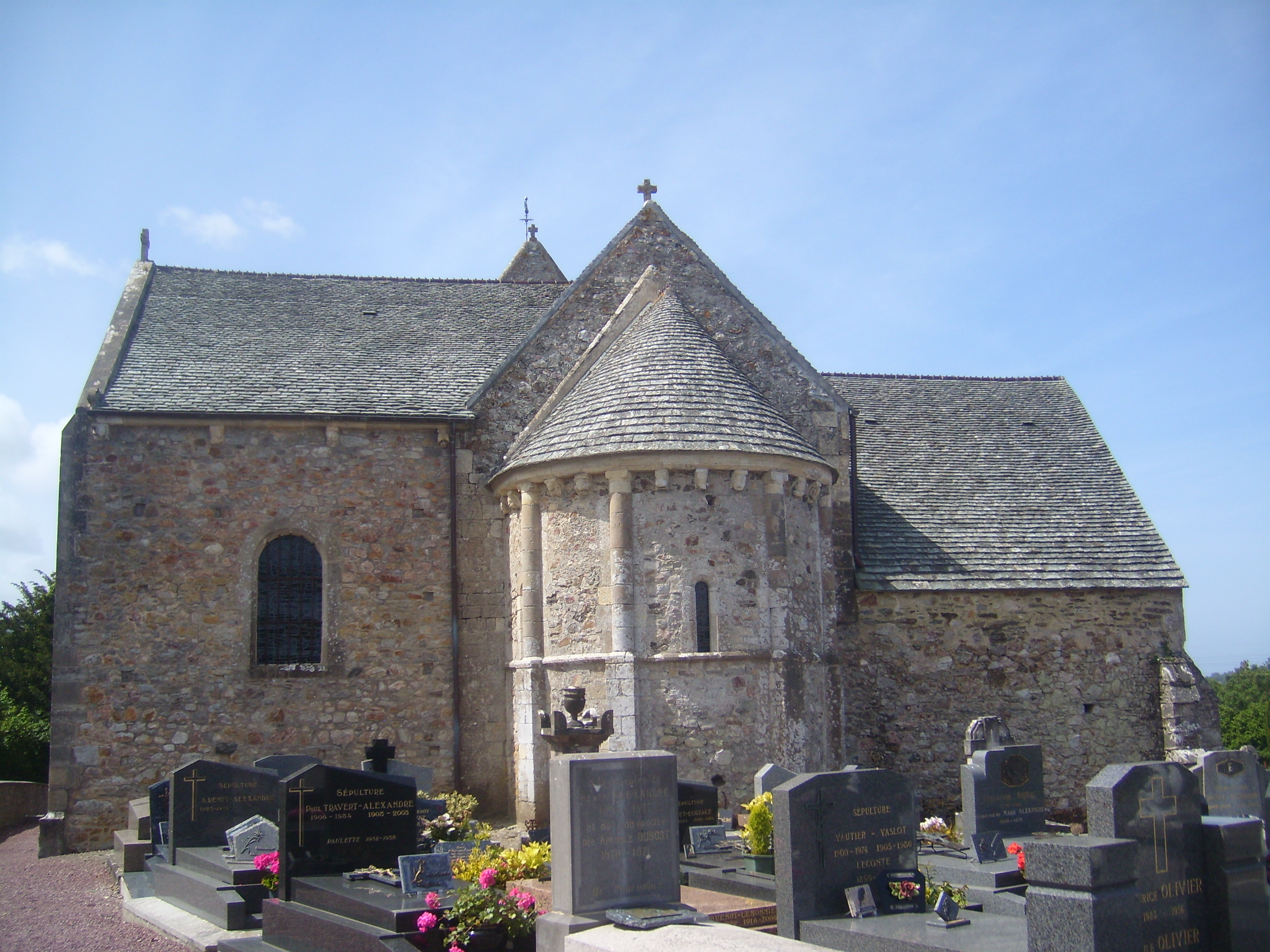
- Apse of the church of Notre-Dame
- Location of Martinvast
- Location within France Location within Normandy
- Coordinates: 49°35′48″N 1°39′46″W
- Country: France
- Region: Normandy
- Department: Manche
- Arrondissement: Cherbourg
- Canton: Cherbourg-en-Cotentin-3
- Intercommunality: CA Cotentin

Government
  - Mayor (2020–2026): Jacky Marie
- Area^{1}: 10.31 km^{2} (3.98 sq mi)
- Elevation: 58 m (190 ft)
- Population (2023): 1,348
  - Density: 130.7/km^{2} (338.6/sq mi)
- Time zone: UTC+01:00 (CET)
  - Summer (DST): UTC+02:00 (CEST)
- INSEE/Postal code: 50294 /50690
- ^{1} French Land Register data, which excludes lakes, ponds, glaciers > 1 km^{2} (0.386 sq mi or 247 acres) and river estuaries.

Martinvast (French pronunciation: [maʁtɛ̃va]) is a commune on the Cotentin Peninsula in the Manche department in Normandy in north-western France.

== See also ==
- Communes of the Manche department
