= Manche =

Department of France

- Department
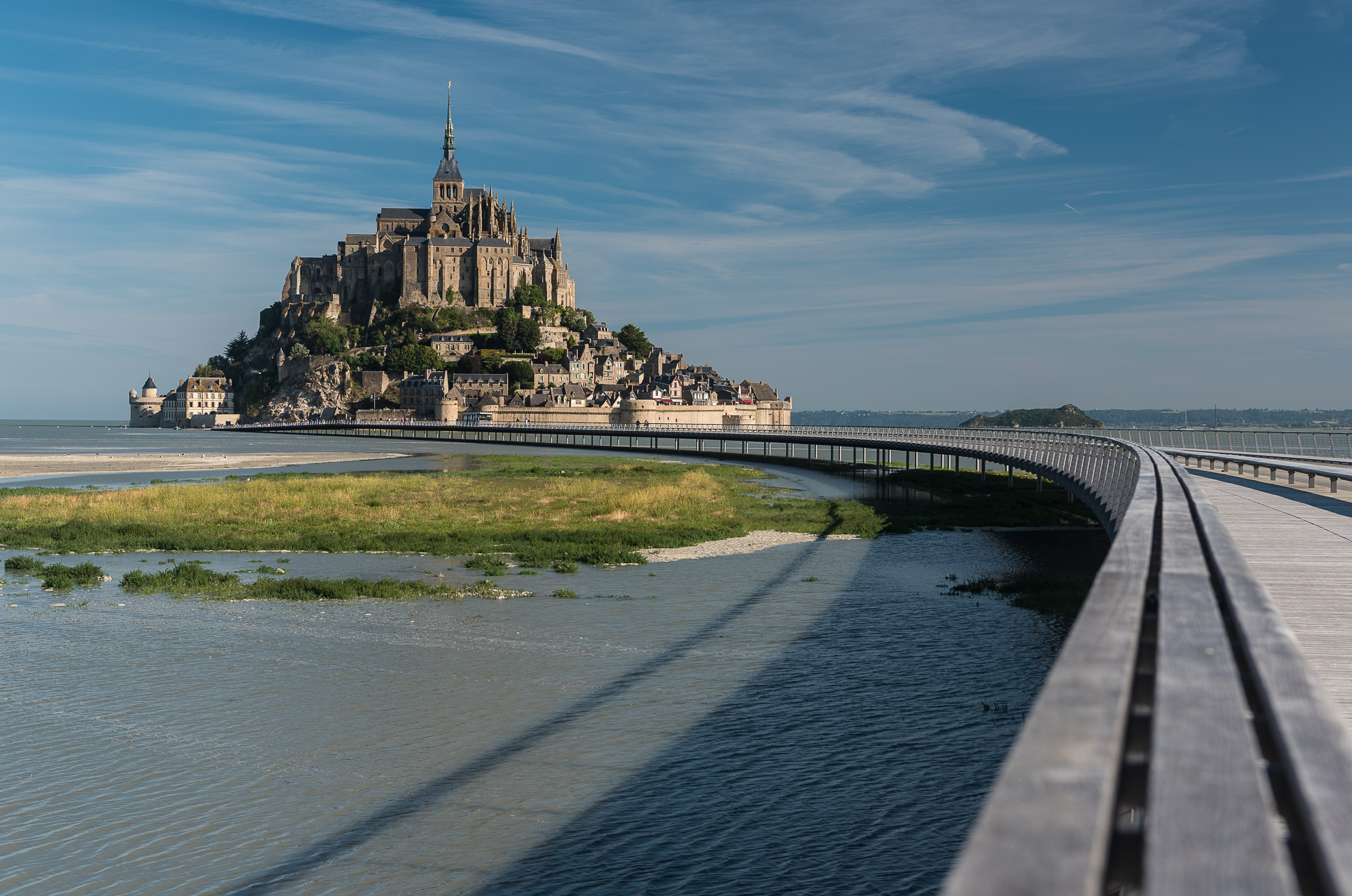
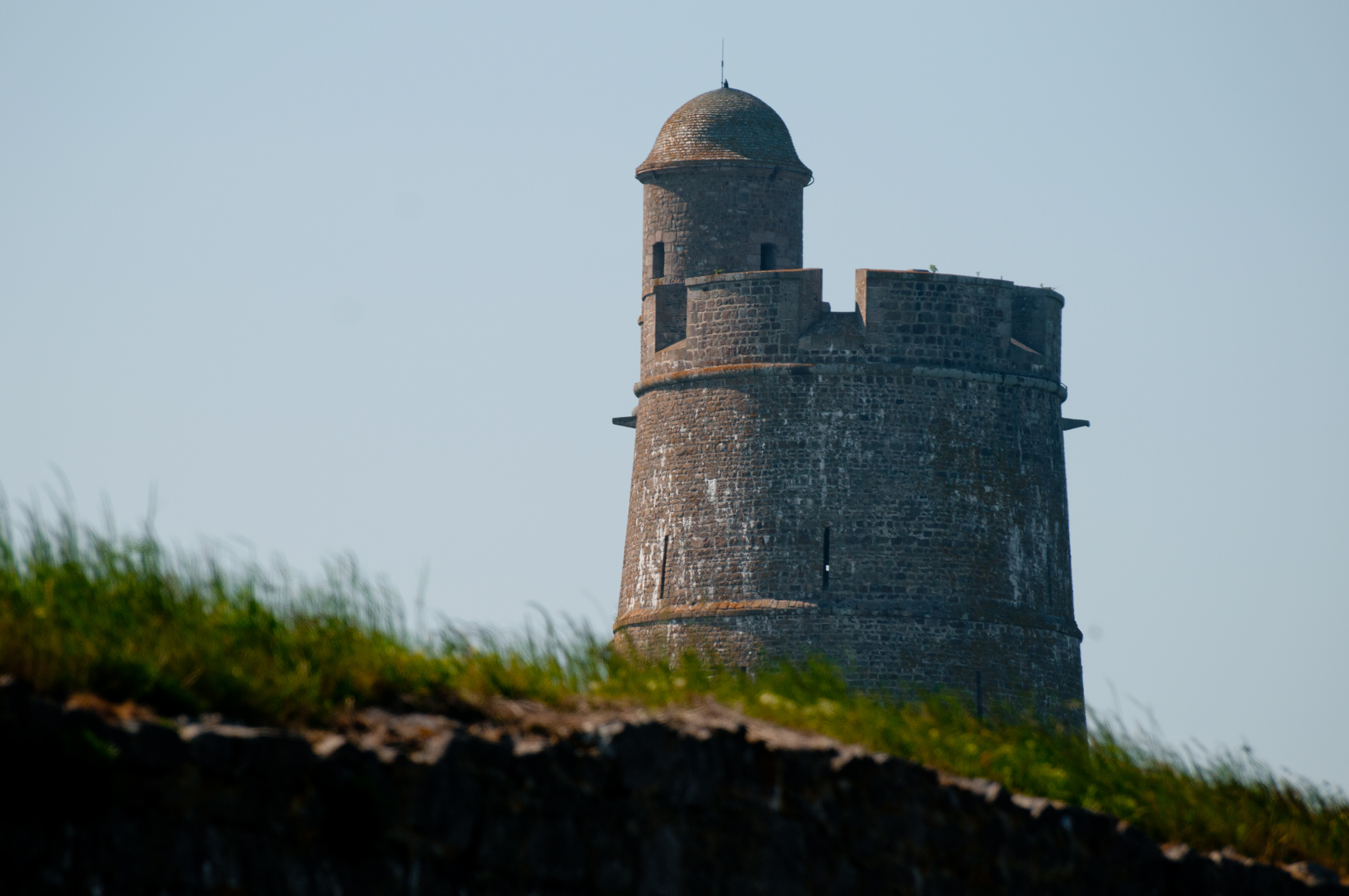
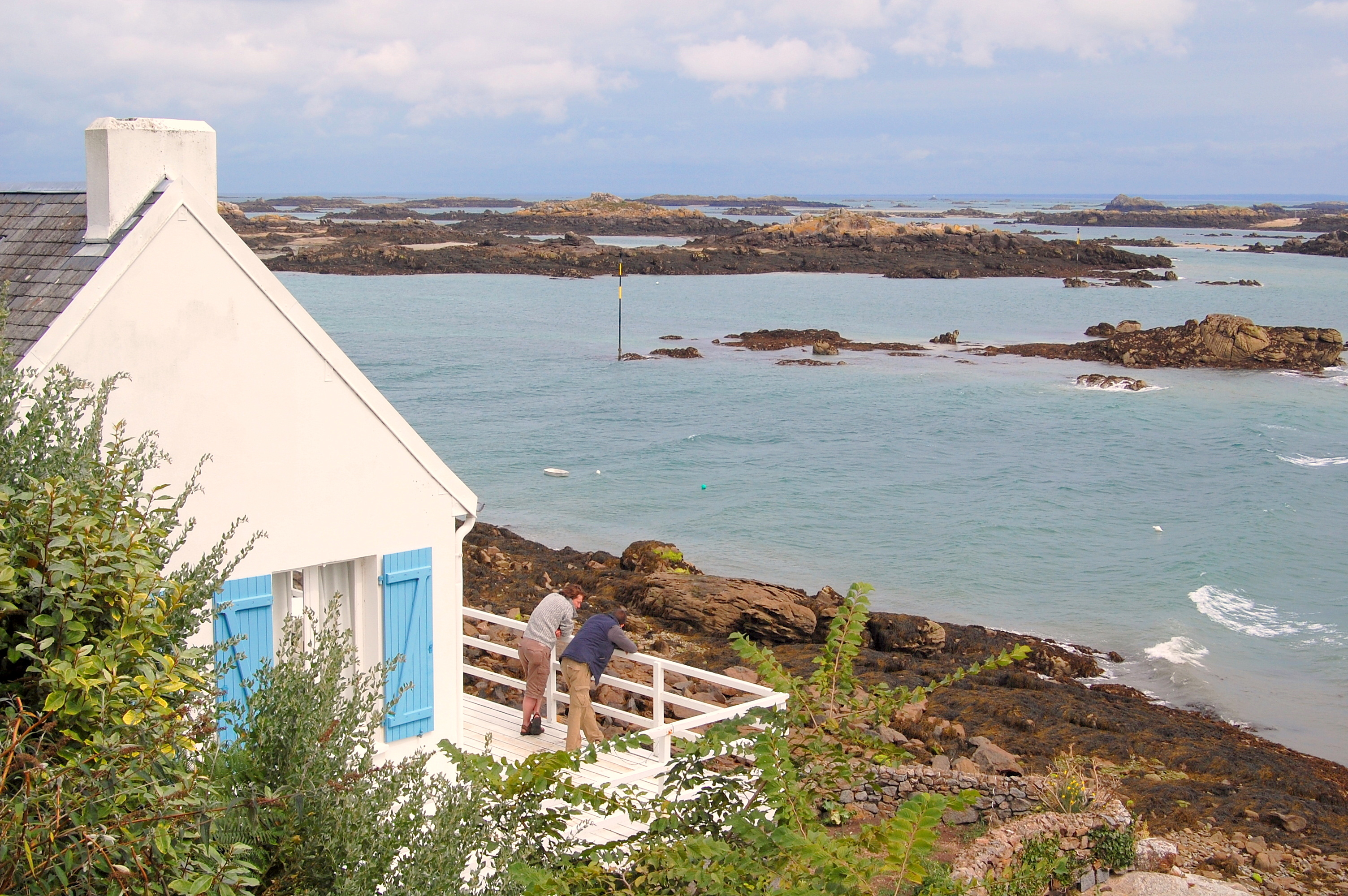
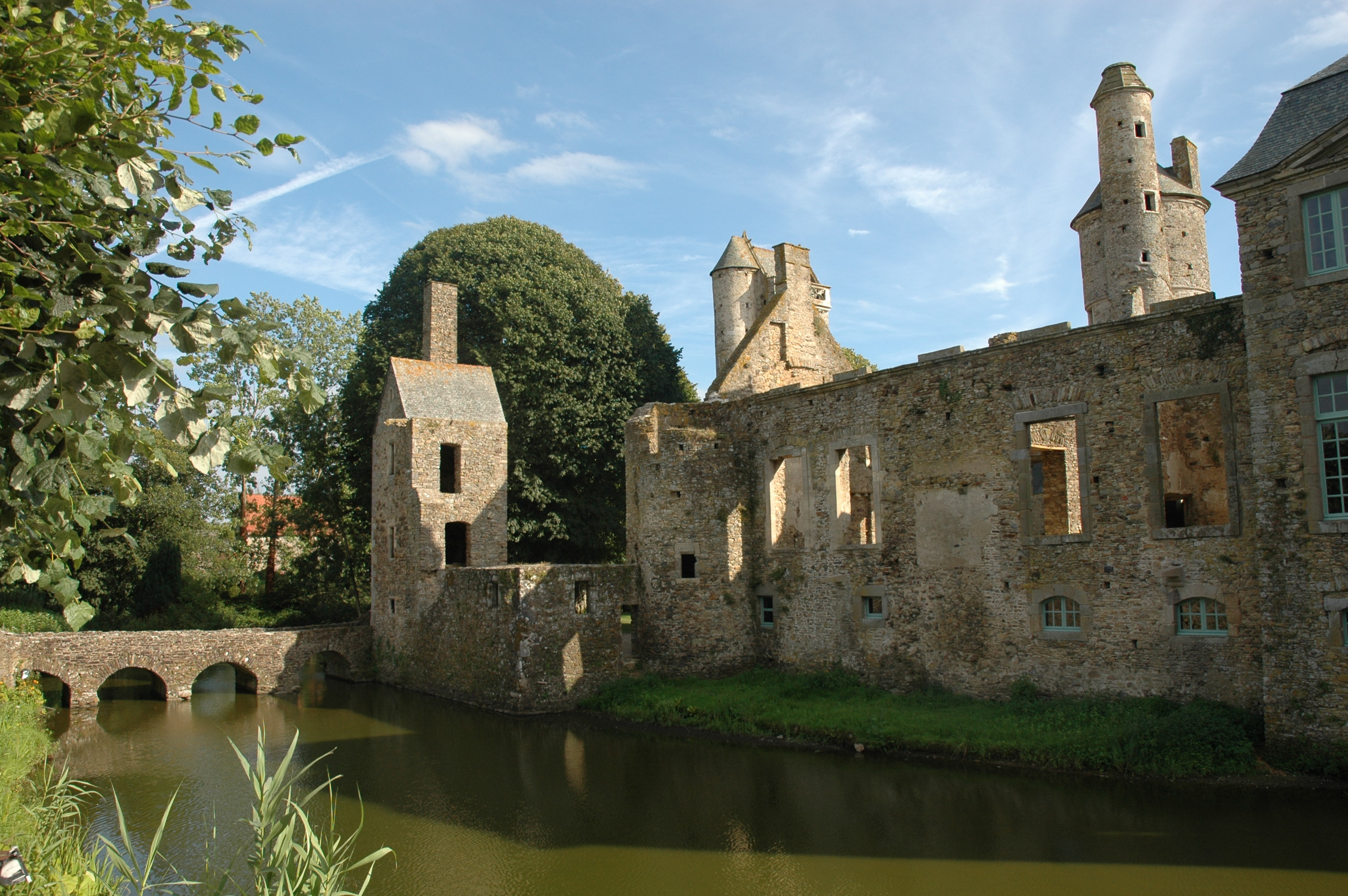
- From top down, left to right: Mont-Saint-Michel, Watchtowers in Saint-Vaast-la-Hougue, Islands of Chausey and Château de Gratot

- Flag Coat of arms

- Location of Manche in France
- Coordinates: 49°03′N 01°15′E
- Country: France
- Region: Normandy
- Prefecture: Saint-Lô
- Subprefectures: Avranches; Cherbourg; Coutances

Government
  - President of the Departmental Council: Jean Morin (DVD)

Area^{1}
  - Total: 5,951 km^{2} (2,298 sq mi)

Population (2023)
  - Total: 497,522
  - Rank: 53rd
  - Density: 83.60/km^{2} (216.5/sq mi)
- Demonyms: Manchois, Manchots
- Time zone: UTC+1 (CET)
  - Summer (DST): UTC+2 (CEST)
- ISO 3166 code: FR-50
- Department number: 50
- Arrondissements: 4
- Constituency: 4
- Cantons: 27
- Intercommunality: 8
- Communes: 445
- ^1 French Land Register data, which exclude estuaries, lakes, ponds, and glaciers larger than 1 km^{2}

Manche (/mɒ̃ʃ/; French: [mɑ̃ʃ]; Norman: Maunche) is a coastal French department in Normandy on the English Channel, which is known as La Manche, literally "the sleeve", in French. Manche is bordered by Ille-et-Vilaine and Mayenne to the south, Orne and Calvados to the east, the English Channel to the west and north and by sharing maritime borders with the British Crown Dependencies of Bailiwick of Jersey and Bailiwick of Guernsey to the west. It had a population of 497,522 in 2023.

== History ==
Manche is one of the original 83 Departments of France, established during the French Revolution on 26 February 1790. It was created from part of the province of Normandy.

The capital was Coutances until 1796, when it became Saint-Lô, then Coutances again temporarily following the almost complete destruction of Saint-Lô during the Battle of Normandy following D-Day in World War II. When Saint-Lô was rebuilt, it resumed as capital.

== Geography ==
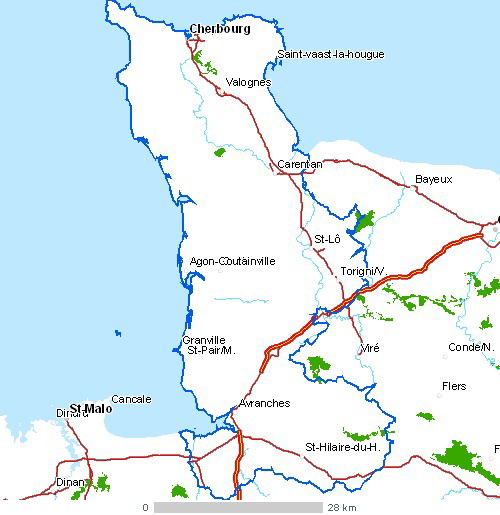
Map of Cotentin peninsula

The department includes the Cotentin Peninsula down to the famous Mont St Michel. Of the Channel Islands, only the island of Chausey forms part of the territory of the department.

Manche borders the Normandy departments of Calvados to the east and Orne to the southeast. Mayenne, a department of the Pays de la Loire, is to the south-east, and Ille-et-Vilaine in Brittany is to the south-west and it shares maritime borders with Bailiwick of Jersey and Bailiwick of Guernsey of the United Kingdom to the west. The salient of this department is the longest in France. It is also the second longest salient in Europe, after Odesa Oblast in Ukraine.

The region is lush and green with sandy beaches and remains oriented towards farming. The peninsula was originally joined as a single land mass to Cornwall and Dorset in England, meaning that the underlying geological strata of both regions are very similar. However, there are substantial regional differences today in terms of flora and fauna, and farming practices have varied considerably between the United Kingdom and France. Flat marsh areas in the department attract many bird-watchers. The region in and around Saint-Lô is also the equestrian capital of France, where the cooler climate compared to the south is ideal for breeding and training.

France's first EPR nuclear reactor is under construction at Flamanville near Cherbourg and is planned to start operations in late 2023.

=== Principal towns ===
The most populous commune is Cherbourg-en-Cotentin; and the prefecture Saint-Lô is the second-most populous. As of 2023, there are six communes with more than 10,000 inhabitants:

| Commune | Population (2023) |
|---|---|
| Cherbourg-en-Cotentin | 78,258 |
| Saint-Lô | 19,471 |
| Granville | 12,510 |
| La Hague | 11,484 |
| Carentan-les-Marais | 10,218 |
| Avranches | 10,143 |

=== Climate ===
The west coast of France benefits from the influence of the Gulf Stream, resulting in an oceanic with relatively mild winters in which temperatures go below 0 °C (32 °F) only for a few days. Summer temperatures are usually around 20 °C (68 °F), and can occasionally reach 35 °C (95 °F) in direct sunlight. Precipitation is heavy but varies greatly by region, 700 to 1,300 mm (28 to 51 in) in the southern central area. Highly localised but not life-threatening flash flooding has been experienced during the last few springs.

The impact of the Gulf Stream has enabled the naturalization of Mediterranean and exotic plants such as mimosas, palms, and agaves.

There is often a sea breeze on the coast, which combined with tides, contributes to rapid temperature changes in the course of a single day. Sea temperatures allow swimming between June and October.

== Demographics ==
Inhabitants of the department are called Manchots or Manchois in French.

Population development since 1801:

Historical population

| Year | Pop. | ±% p.a. |
|---|---|---|
| 1801 | 530,631 | — |
| 1806 | 581,429 | +1.85% |
| 1821 | 594,196 | +0.14% |
| 1831 | 591,284 | −0.05% |
| 1841 | 597,334 | +0.10% |
| 1851 | 600,882 | +0.06% |
| 1861 | 591,421 | −0.16% |
| 1872 | 544,776 | −0.74% |
| 1881 | 526,377 | −0.38% |
| 1891 | 513,815 | −0.24% |
| 1901 | 491,372 | −0.45% |
| 1911 | 476,119 | −0.31% |
| 1921 | 425,512 | −1.12% |
| 1931 | 433,473 | +0.19% |

| Year | Pop. | ±% p.a. |
|---|---|---|
| 1936 | 438,539 | +0.23% |
| 1946 | 435,468 | −0.07% |
| 1954 | 446,860 | +0.32% |
| 1962 | 446,878 | +0.00% |
| 1968 | 452,705 | +0.22% |
| 1975 | 452,275 | −0.01% |
| 1982 | 466,482 | +0.44% |
| 1990 | 480,123 | +0.36% |
| 1999 | 481,983 | +0.04% |
| 2007 | 495,676 | +0.35% |
| 2012 | 499,890 | +0.17% |
| 2017 | 496,883 | −0.12% |
| 2023 | 497,522 | +0.02% |

== Politics ==
The president of the Departmental Council is Jean Morin, elected in July 2021.

=== Presidential elections, 2nd round ===
| Election | Winning candidate | Party | % | 2nd place candidate | Party | % |
|---|---|---|---|---|---|---|
| 2022 | Emmanuel Macron | LREM | 59.61 | Marine Le Pen | FN | 40.39 |
| 2017 | Emmanuel Macron | LREM | 67.23 | Marine Le Pen | FN | 32.77 |
| 2012 | Nicolas Sarkozy | UMP | 50.10 | François Hollande | PS | 49.90 |
| 2007 | Nicolas Sarkozy | UMP | 56.17 | Ségolène Royal | PS | 43.83 |
| 2002 | Jacques Chirac | RPR | 85.31 | Jean-Marie Le Pen | FN | 14.69 |

=== Current National Assembly Representatives ===
| Constituency | Member | Party |
|---|---|---|
| Manche's 1st constituency | Philippe Gosselin | The Republicans |
| Manche's 2nd constituency | Bertrand Sorre | Renaissance |
| Manche's 3rd constituency | Stéphane Travert | Renaissance |
| Manche's 4th constituency | Anna Pic | Socialist Party |

== Sports ==
- Football: main clubs: AS Cherbourg, US Avranches, FC Saint-Lô, US Granville, CS Villedieu, FC Équeurdreville-Hainneville...
- Cycling: the Tour de France has visited the department 21 times with stages ending at Cherbourg (16), Avranches (2), Granville (1), Saint-Hilaire-du-Harcouët (1), and the Mont-Saint-Michel (1).
- Sailing: the Solitaire du Figaro has come to Cherbourg several times.
- Tennis: hosts the Challenger La Manche tournament.
- Thai boxing: Villedieu-les-Poêles
- Badminton: Two local clubs compete in the national championship (N3): St Hilaire du Harcouet and Hainneville.
- Golf: course: Granville, Bréhal, Coutainville, Cherbourg, Centre Manche, Fontenay, Côte des Isles

== Gallery ==
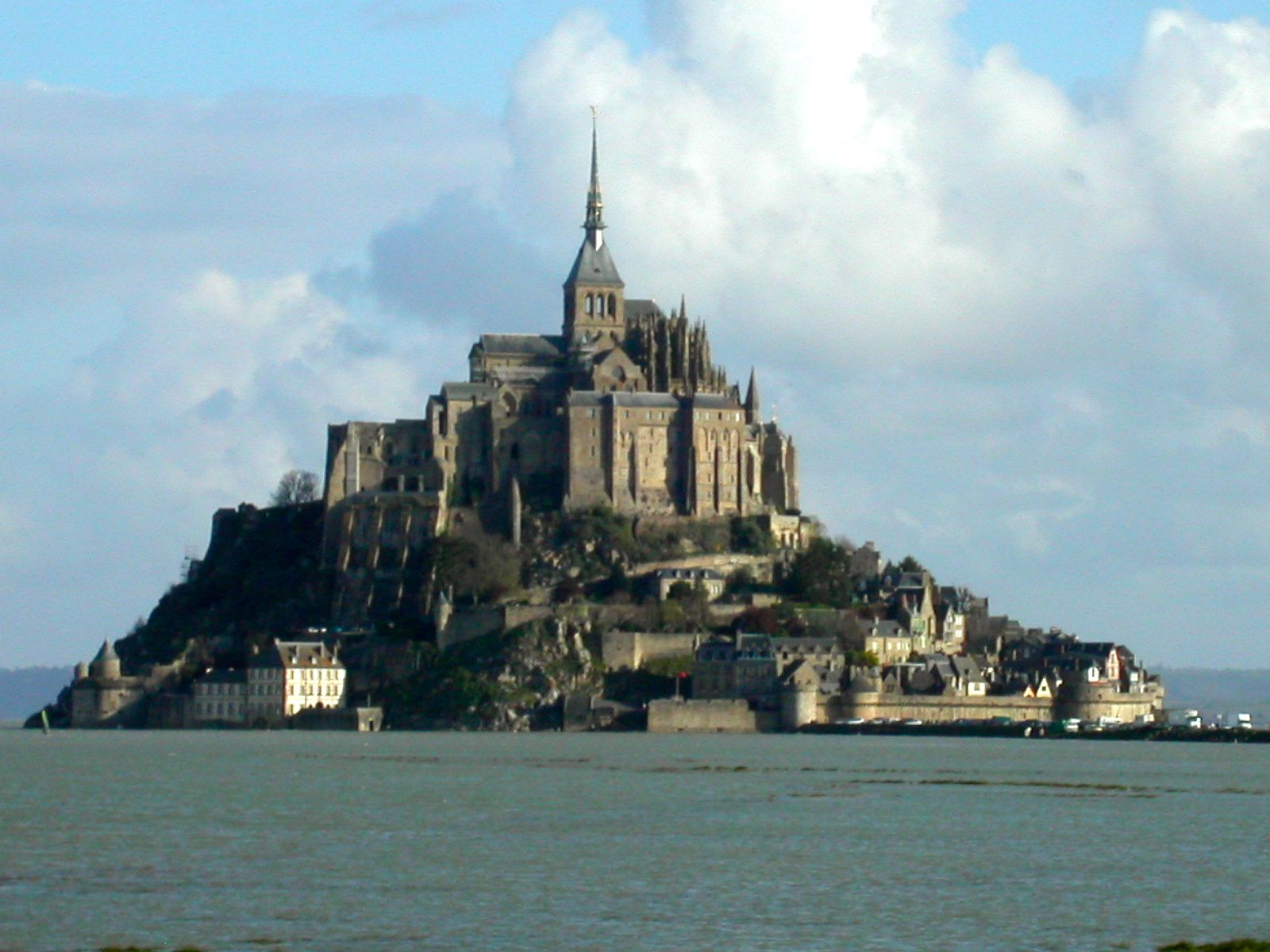
Mont-Saint-Michel

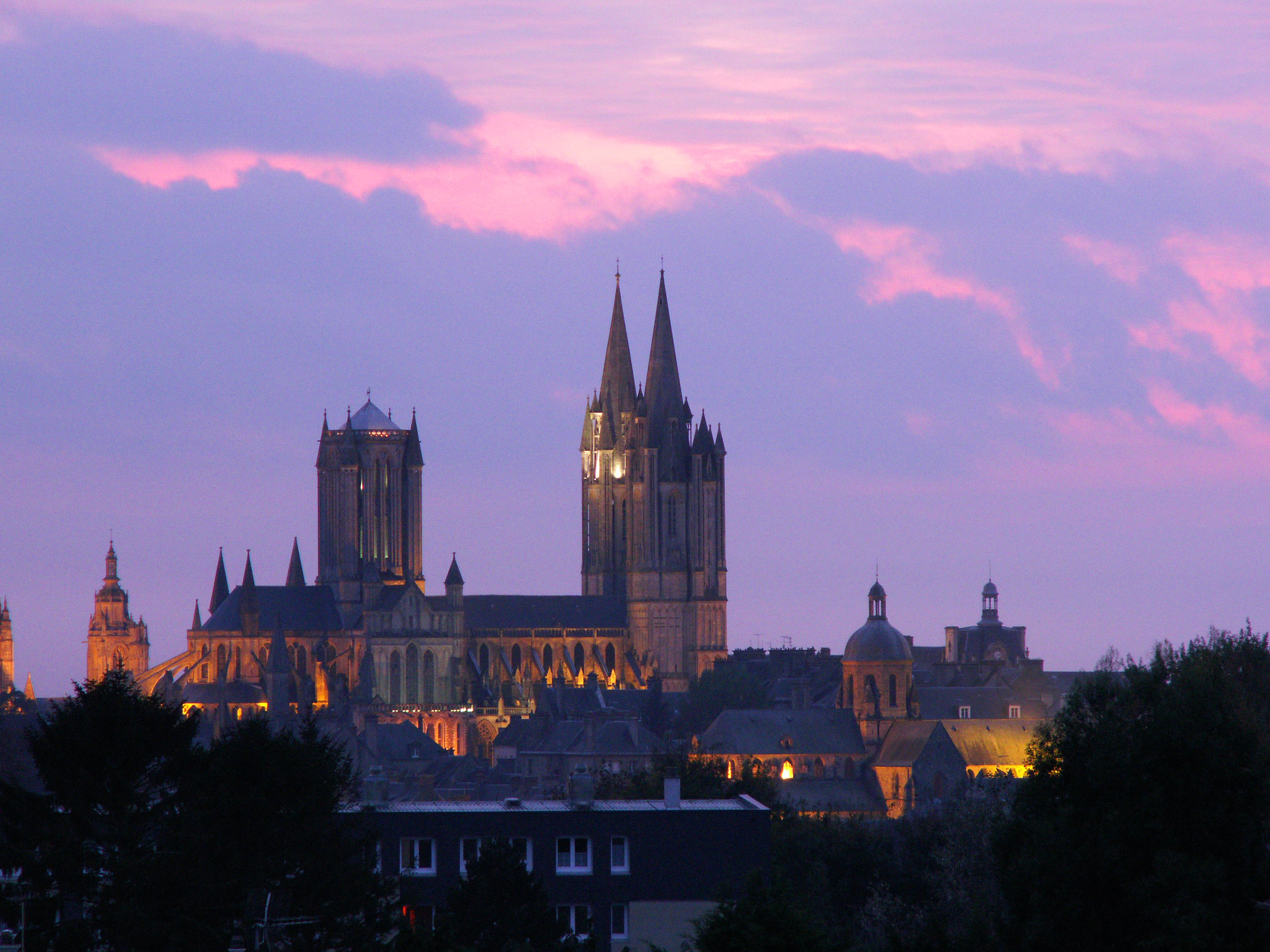
Coutances Cathedral

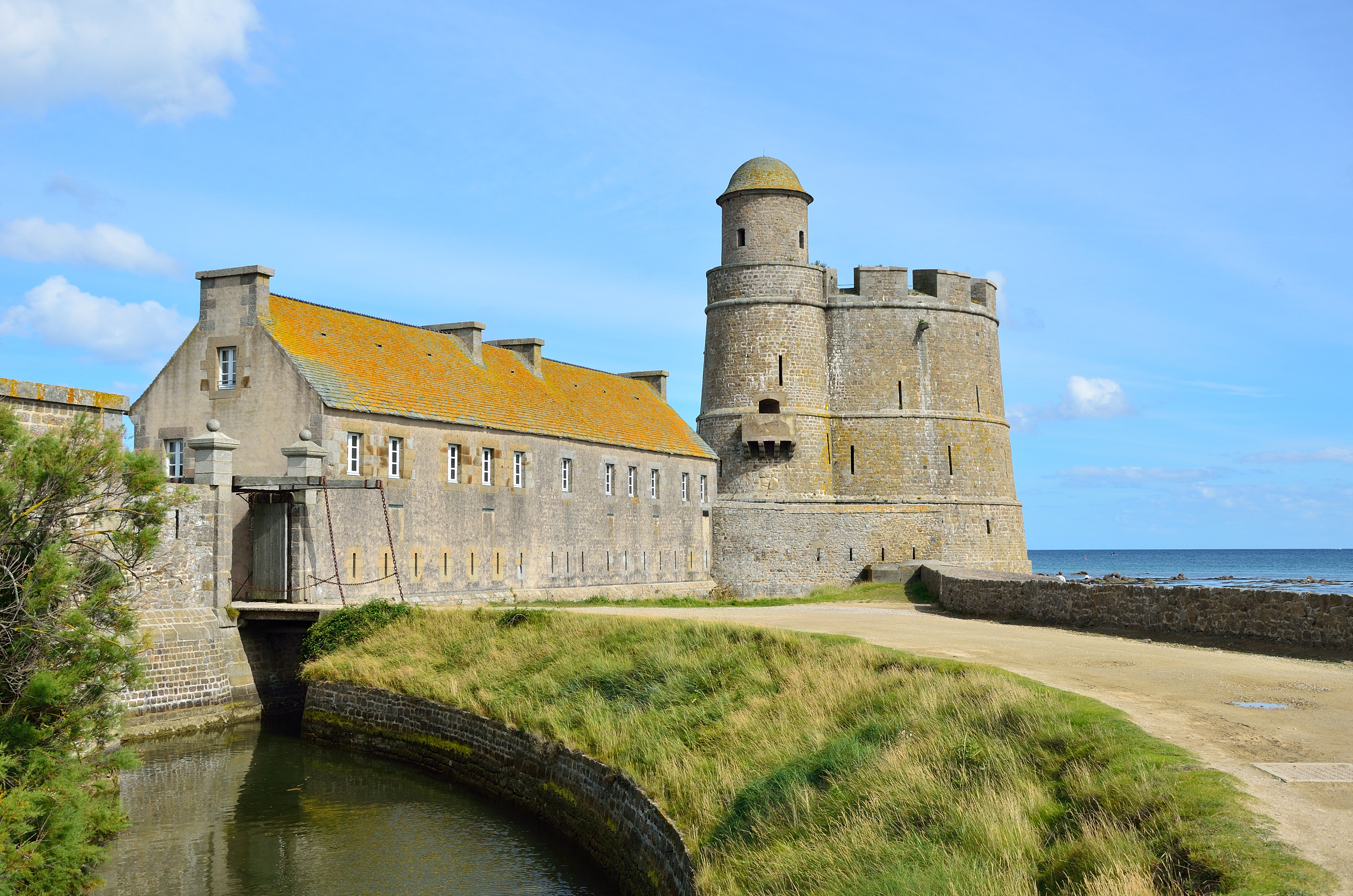
Tour Vauban in Tatihou

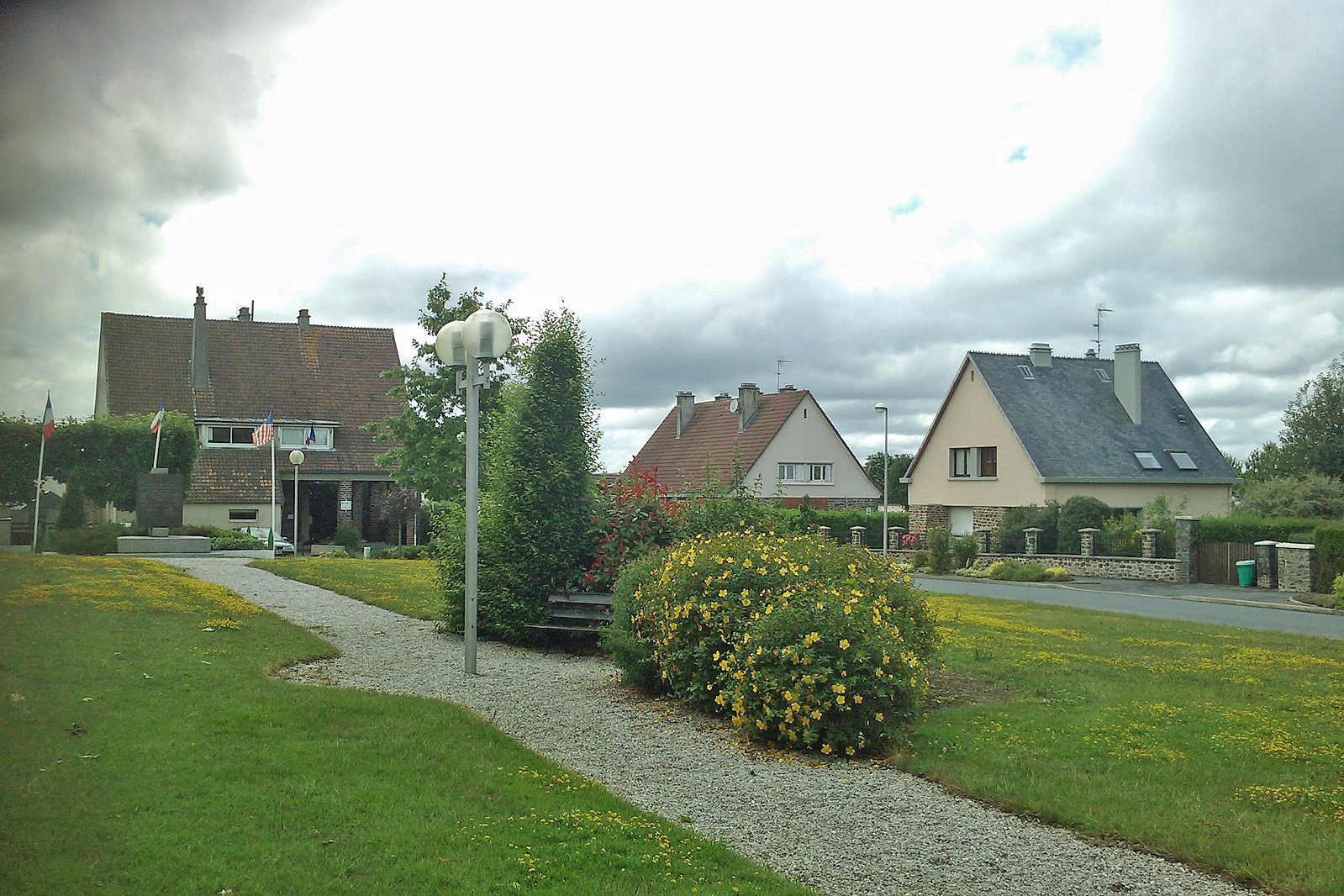
A neighbourhood in Saint-André-de-l'Épine

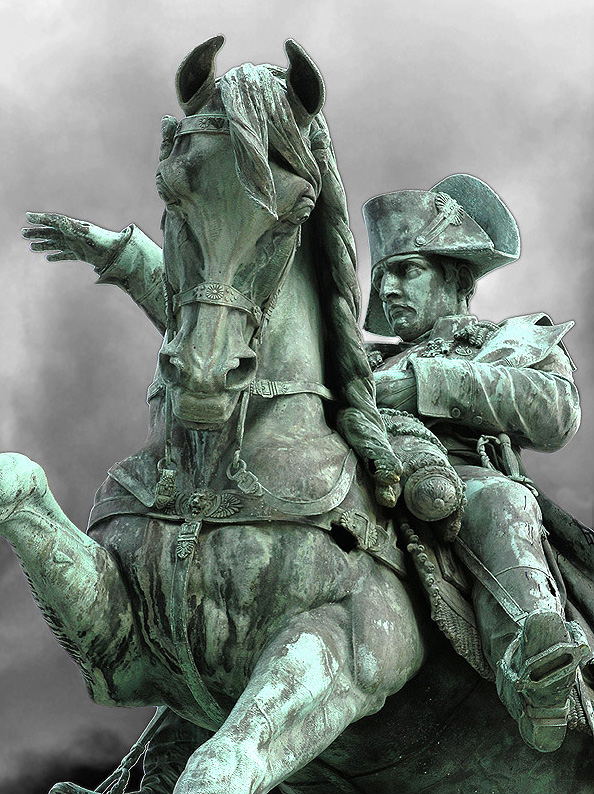
Napoleon's statue in Cherbourg

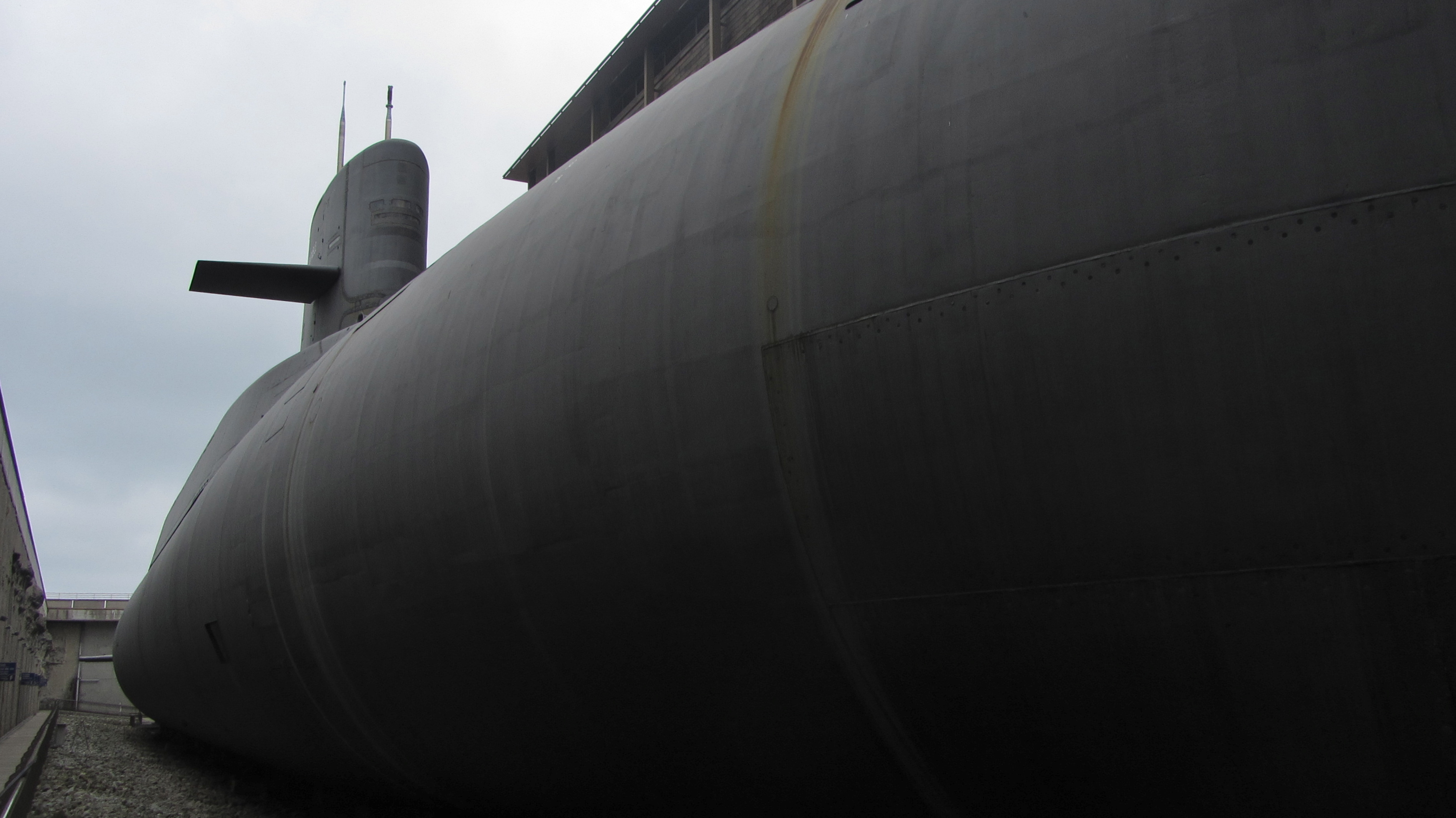
Le Redoutable submarine at the Cité de la Mer

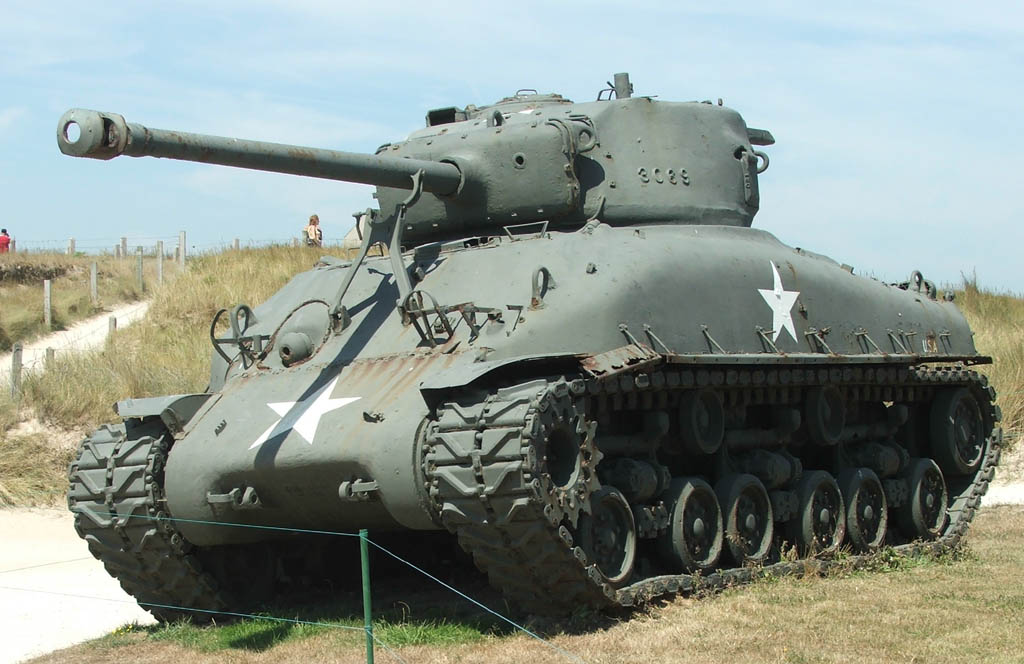
A monument of the Normandy landings in Utah Beach

== See also ==
- Cantons of the Manche department
- Communes of the Manche department
- Arrondissements of the Manche department
- Cotentinais, the Norman dialect of Manche.
