= Cherbourg Naval Base =

Naval base in Cherbourg, France

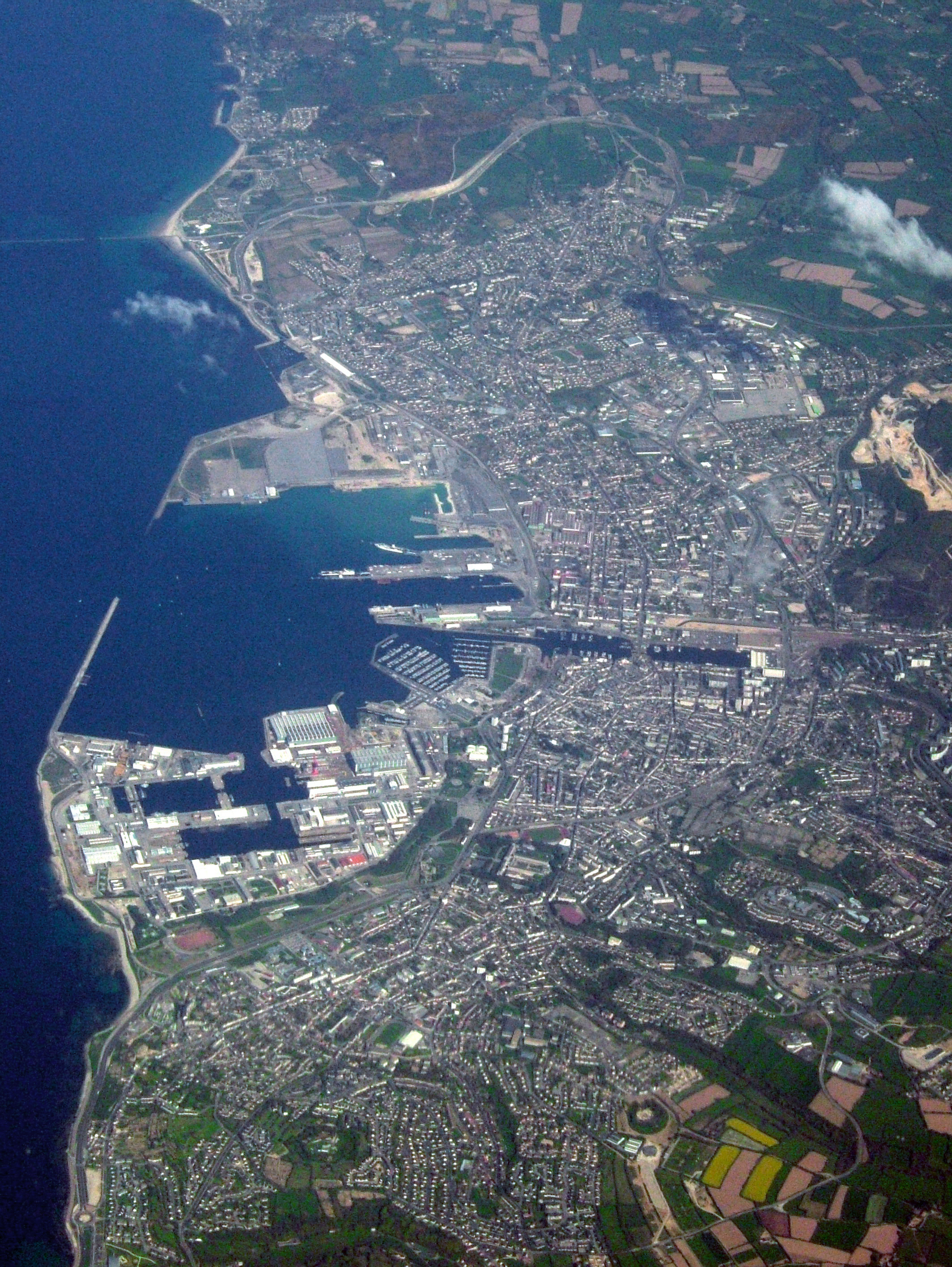
- Aerial view of the port of Cherbourg
- Interactive map of Cherbourg Naval Base
- Location in France

Location
- Location: France
- Coordinates: 49°39′09″N 1°38′03″W

Cherbourg Naval Base is a naval base in Cherbourg Harbour, Cherbourg, Manche department, Normandy. The town has been a base of the French Navy since the opening of the military port in 1813.

== History ==
=== Early works ===
Cherbourg had been a stronghold since Roman times, and was one of the strongest fortresses of the Hundred Years War. But until the 18th century it had only a shallow harbour, minor commercial activity and no military development. In the 17th century the military engineer Vauban drew up plans to develop Cherbourg into a port where passing ships could shelter from attack or storms. Vauban's plans included an artificial harbour, and the quadrupling of the size of the city. The project was eventually abandoned, before being temporarily revived under Louis XV. The British raid on Cherbourg in 1758 however caused severe damage to the barely completed commercial port.

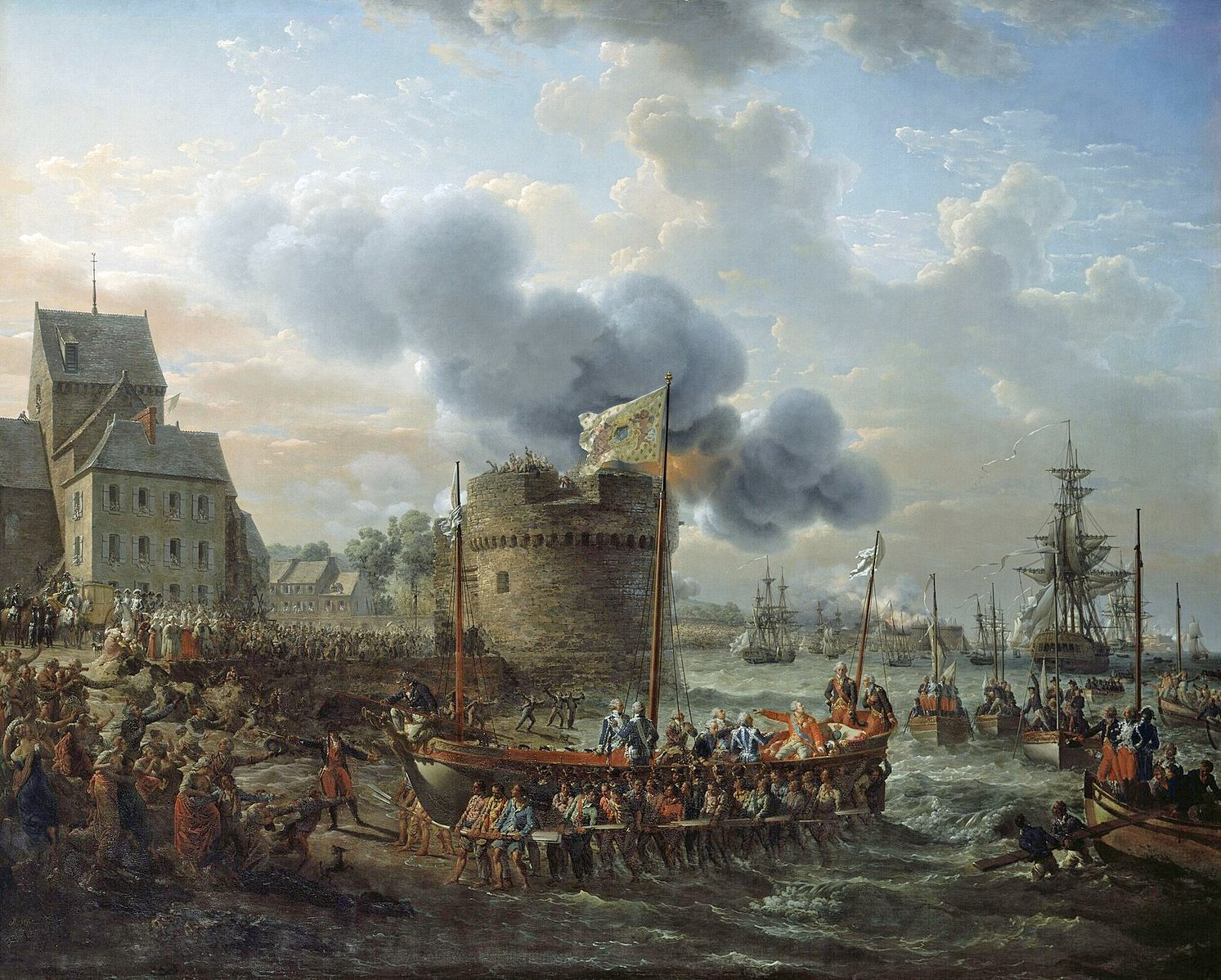
Visit of Louis XVI to Cherbourg in June 1786, Louis-Philippe Crépin, 1817

By the 1770s, with French involvement in the American War of Independence, Louis XVI sought to create a large military port on the Cotentin Peninsula, allowing access into the English Channel, and comparable to that of Brest on the Atlantic. Two projects were drawn up and presented to the king in 1777. The first, by the chief engineer of the bridges, roads and ports of the Caen region, Armand Lefebvre, called for the fortification of the Cherbourg roadstead around the enlarged commercial port. The second project, by director of maritime engineering Antoine Choquet de Lindu, proposed the construction of a first class arsenal at La Hougue. Naval officer Louis de La Couldre de La Bretonnière conducted a review of the proposals, which favoured the Cherbourg option. La Bretonnière recommended the construction of a jetty "two thousand toises long" between the tip of Querqueville and the reefs of Île Pelée, with the dredging of a harbour to a depth of 20 meters.

La Bretonnière suggested the construction of a breakwater composed of sunken hulks and rocks, to be a foundation for further construction. Ultimately an alternative proposal, by engineer Louis-Alexandre de Cessart, was preferred, that of a breakwater created by the sinking of 90 wooden cones weighted with stones, 50 meters in diameter at the base and 20 meters in height. Work began in the 1780s. Île Pelée was fortified, and the wooden cones filled with stone were sunk outside the harbour(one in the presence of the king), to serve as a foundation for the breakwater. The cones were damaged by bad weather, and were gradually replaced by a continuous breakwater in pierres perdues, when the works were interrupted by the French Revolution.

=== Nineteenth century ===
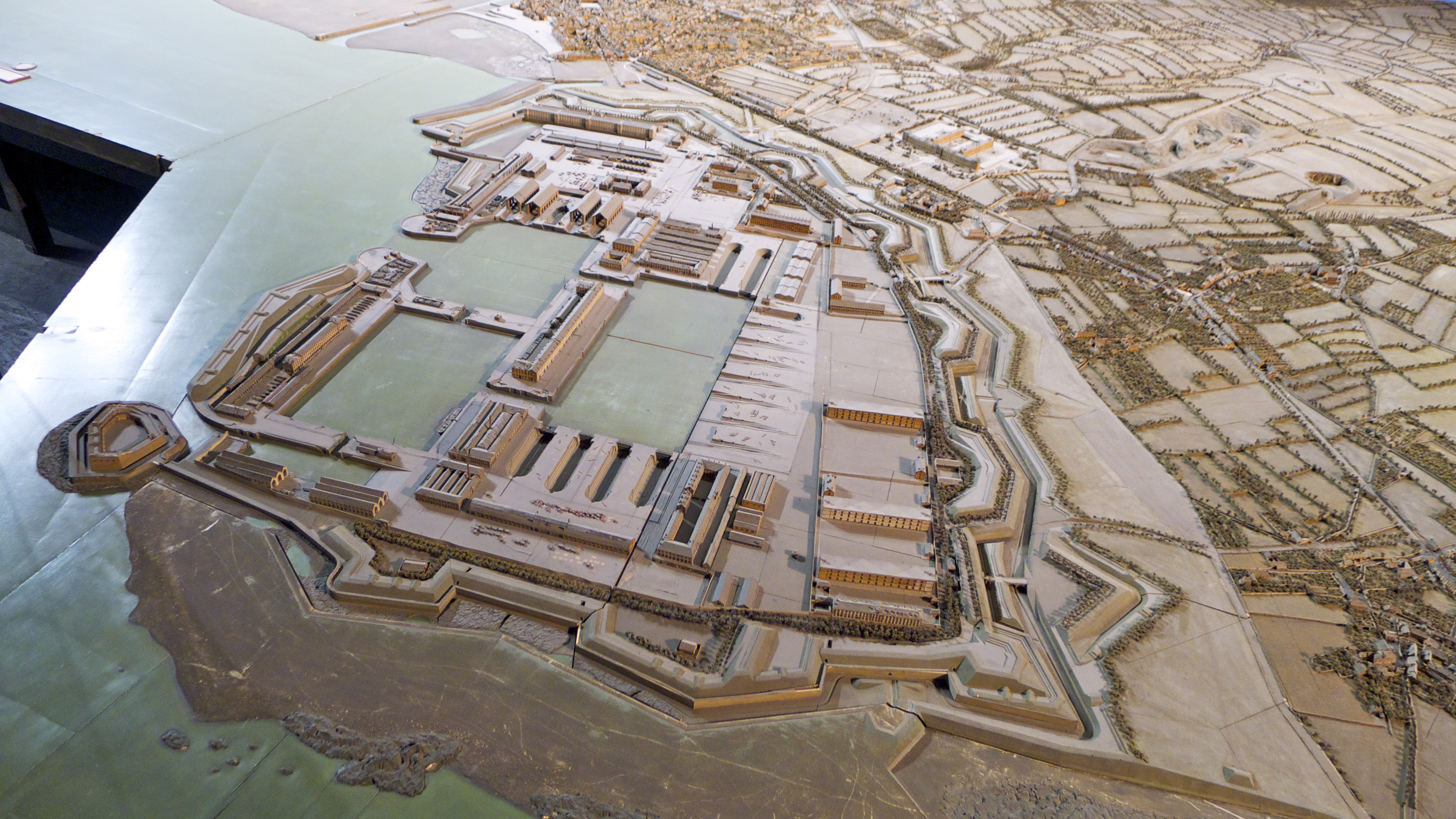
Model of Cherbourg Arsenal as it appeared in 1872

Work resumed in 1803 under the orders of First Consul Napoleon Bonaparte (decree of 25 Germinal year XI), as part of the plans to invade the United Kingdom. From 1803, protected from British attacks, Cherbourg became a haven for privateers. The breakwater was discontinued after 1813, to be resumed in 1830 and completed in 1853. The engineer Joseph Cachin continued building the military port to the west of the town, the avant-port of which was opened on 27 August 1813 by Empress Marie-Louise. It was decided to establish the Arsenal in the same place.

Work began on the Charles X basin (420 × 200 × 18 meters) in 1814, and it was inaugurated on 25 August 1829 in the presence of the Dauphin. A second basin, Napoleon III (290 × 220 × 18 meters), was begun in 1836 and inaugurated on 7 August 1858 in the presence of Napoleon III and Empress Eugénie. The continuous expansion of the military port and dockyard eventually came to consume between 3 and 4 million gold francs a year. By the end of the nineteenth century the United Kingdom was no longer the main adversary. The city had become a major industrial centre and employer, with 4,000 workers from all over France based at the arsenal, which became the "backbone of the city". With the naval importance of the port reduced, the well-developed harbour became a base for transatlantic trade connecting northern Europe with the east coast of the Americas.

=== Second World War ===
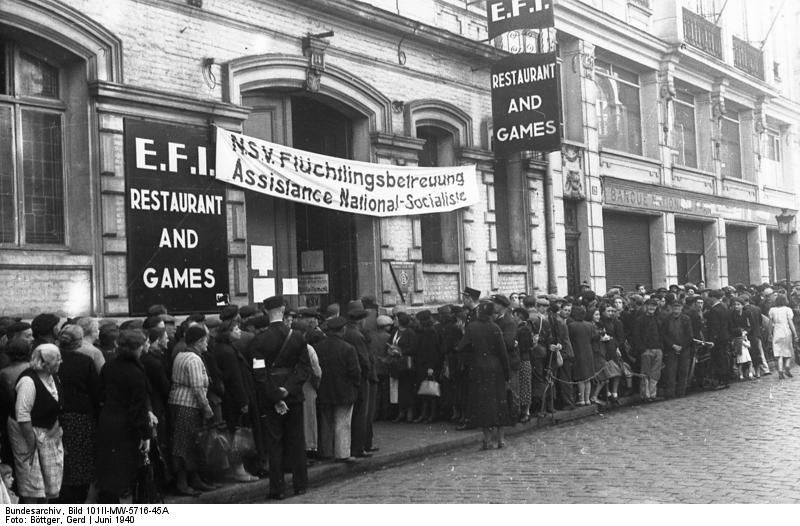
Cherbourg under German occupation, June 1940

The city was first bombed by the Luftwaffe on 15 June 1940, during the Battle of France. The port was used as the evacuation point as British and French soldiers withdrew ahead of the advancing German Army, Cherbourg becoming the "Norman Dunkirk". The east fort on the breakwater was destroyed by the French Navy. German forces arrived at Cherbourg on 17 June, and on 18 June the city council declared Cherbourg an open city. Maritime prefect Vice-Admiral Jules Le Bigot ensured three submarines under construction at the arsenal, Praya, Roland Morillot and Martinique, were destroyed, and then surrendered the city to General Erwin Rommel.

==== Battle of Cherbourg ====
Cherbourg, the only deep-water port in the region, was the primary goal of US troops landed at Utah Beach during the allied invasion of Normandy. Cherbourg was vital in order to provide the Allies logistical support for the reinforcement and supply of the troops. US troops encircled the city on 21 June 1944. Furious street fighting took place, with heavy supporting fire from allied warships against the German batteries. After strong resistance from Fort du Roule, General Karl-Wilhelm von Schlieben, Admiral Walter Hennecke and 37,000 soldiers surrendered on 26 June at 16:00 to General J. Lawton Collins. The arsenal and the forts on the breakwater resisted for another day before they too surrendered.

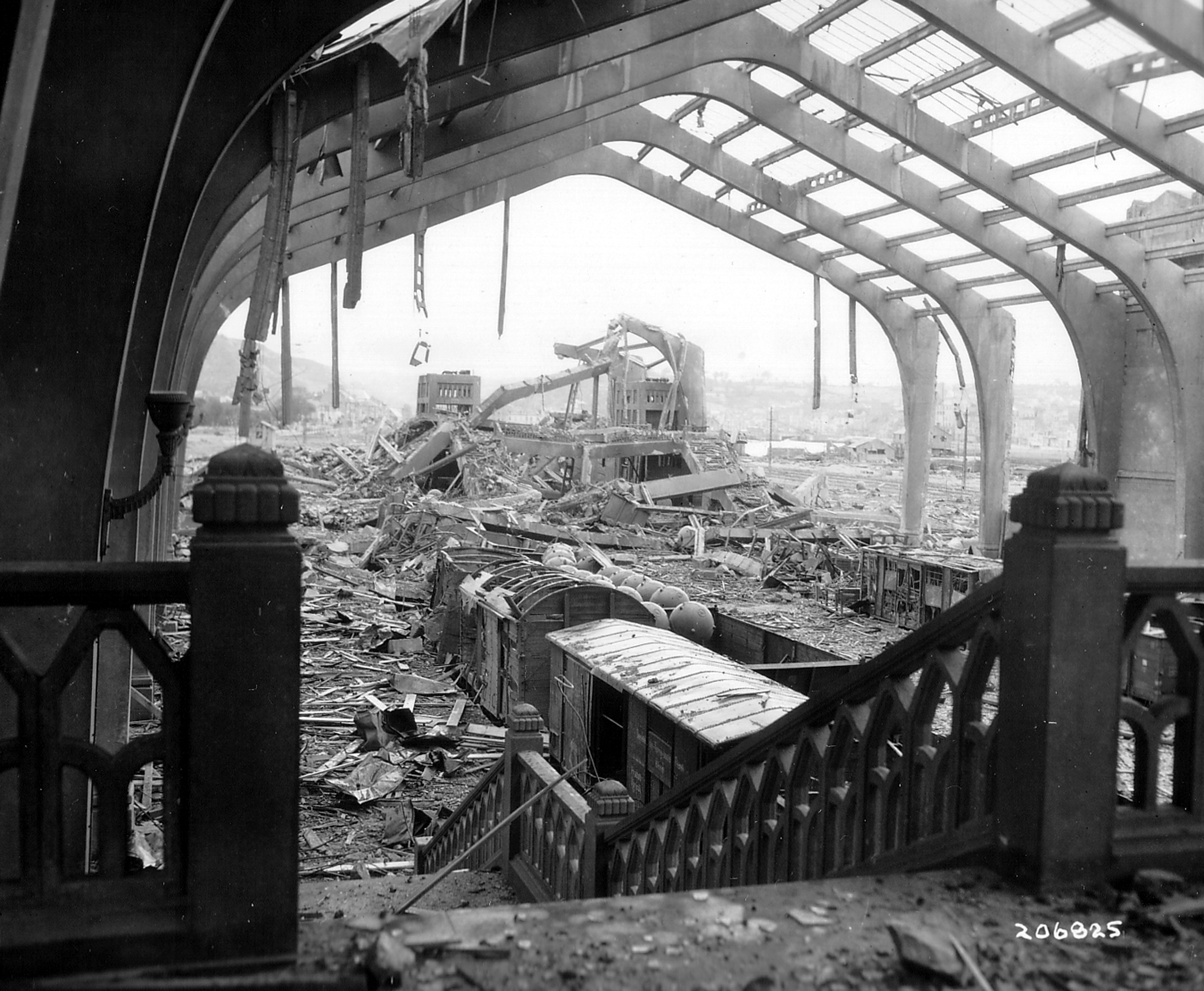
Damage to the city after allied bombardment, 1944

The Germans had systematically damaged the port prior to surrendering. Ships, tugs, cranes and other equipment had been thrown into the water in the basins, blocking the harbour and delaying the arrival of the first ships until the end of July. In November 1944, the local Cherbourg bailout commission was created to organise the salvaging of ships and clearing accesses to the port. The port was only partially back in service by mid-August. On 14 July 1944 the Place du Château, renamed Place du Maréchal-Pétain during the German occupation, was renamed Place Général De Gaulle, while the Quai de l'Ancien-Arsenal was renamed Lawton-Collins Quay, after the American commander of VII Corps, which had liberated the city.

American troops of the Fourth Major Port of Embarkation and French transport corps carried out sufficient repairs to the port for it to accommodate the first liberty ships a month after its capture. From then until the liberation of the port of Antwerp in November 1944, the daily landing of supplies and military equipment made Cherbourg the largest port in the world, twice that of the port of New York. Fuel arrived in Cherbourg along the PLUTO pipeline, while men and the equipment were routed from the port to the front, travelling by road (the "Red Ball Express") and rail (the "Toot Sweet Express"). On 24 December 1944, the Belgian freighter SS Léopoldville, carrying 2,237 American soldiers of the 66th Infantry Division, was torpedoed by a German submarine off Cherbourg. 763 were killed and 493 went missing.

Cherbourg was returned to France by the Americans on 14 October 1945. It is quoted in the order of the army of 2 June 1948 and was awarded the Croix de Guerre with palm.

== Current ships assigned ==
Cherbourg is one of three naval bases of metropolitan France (the other two are Brest and Toulon). With the departure of the Flotilla of the North (FLONOR), Cherbourg lost its importance as a port of registry. The Channel Flotilla (Flomanche) monitors the English Channel and the North Sea.

The naval base occupies 120 hectares and commands 13 ships:

- the three Flamant-class patrol vessels of the French Navy: Flamant, Pluvier and Cormoran,
- the radiological surveillance swift boat Coralline,
- the RPC12 tugboats Fréhel and Saire,
- the mine clearance diving support vessel Vulcain,
- the diving support swift boat Acanthe and Magnolia,
- the patrol boats of the Maritime Gendarmerie Athos and Aramis,,
- the support vessel Élan.

Other vessels present:

- Chartered salvage tug Abeille Liberté,
- Patrol boat Thémis (operated by Affaires maritimes)

== Cherbourg Arsenal ==
Plan of Cherbourg harbour

The arsenal of Cherbourg specializes in submarine construction. These are nuclear vessels for the French Navy, such as the Triomphant class and the planned Suffren class, or conventional diesel-electric propulsion vessels for export, such as the Scorpène type. Faced with declining needs, the Navy has since 2000 opened the arsenal to the private sector. It leases 50,000 m^{2} (540,000 sq ft) of land to two companies in its northern part: the Euriware secure management centre (100 employees) and the Ican shipyard (170 employees), specializing in the construction of service boats.
