= Cherbourg Harbour =

Artificial harbour in Normandy, France

Coordinates: 49°39′33″N 1°36′42″W

Aerial view of the city of Cherbourg and the harbor

Plan of Cherbourg harbour showing its outer breakwaters

Cherbourg Harbour (French: rade de Cherbourg; literally, the "roadstead of Cherbourg") is a harbour situated at the northern end of the Cotentin Peninsula, on the English Channel coastline, in Normandy, northwestern France. With a surface area of 1,500 hectares, it is the second largest artificial harbour in the world, after the 4,500 hectare Ras Laffan Harbour in Qatar. As well as Cherbourg Naval Base, it has been used for mercantile shipping.

It was begun in 1783, with its central harbour breakwater completed in 1853 – this was 3.64 km long, an average of 100 m wide at its base and an average of 12 m wide at its top, and sited 4 km from the coast. Three forts were added to its central wall in 1860. This and the two other breakwaters stretch for more than 6 km. The eastern opening into the harbour is 950 m wide and the western one 2.3 km wide. The harbour's maximum depth is 13 m at low tide.

== History ==
Cherbourg had been a strategic stronghold for several centuries - its castle was first built in the 5th century to protect the whole width of the Cotentin. In the 17th century Vauban, Marshal of France, launched a project to fortify the town, but they were finally razed shortly afterwards. In 1692 several naval ships under Amiral de Tourville put into the port at Cherbourg after the opening battle of the Battles of Barfleur and La Hougue—the port's lack of adequate defences were revealed when fire ships destroyed many of the French ships under repair, including the Triomphant at the entry point into the port, the Admirable on the Mielles, and the Soleil Royal, the admiral's flagship, on the pointe du Hommet.

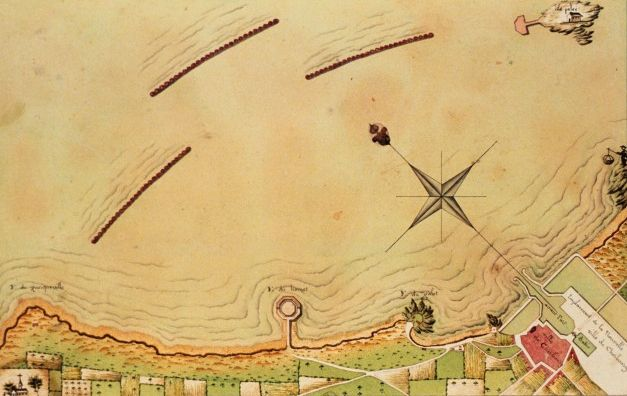
The Cessart design for the harbour.

The long-planned fortification of the town was finally set in motion by King Louis XVI. In 1776, he set up a commission to choose between Cherbourg, Ambleteuse or Boulogne as France's main strategic port for defence of the English Channel - this was headed by Suffren and also including Dumouriez (later governor of Cherbourg) and La Bretonnière. La Bretonnière's report considered that only Cherbourg had a harbour large enough for 80 warships at once. Exceeding Vauban's designs, he planned the construction of a 4 km long harbour wall between île Pelée and pointe de Querqueville. Dumouriez and Decaux, head of the engineers, advised that Louis build a shorter harbour in a straight line between île Pelée and pointe du Hommet, as foreseen by Vauban, with a single central entry point, with the emphasis on military defences. In the end La Bretonnière's plan won, but during the construction phase Decaux argued for the merits of concrete masonry caissons whereas La Bretonnière preferred sinking old warships and building up rock around them. However, the engineer Louis-Alexandre de Cessart's plans were chosen, which involved constructing a mole from 90 tree trunks 20m by 20m, filled in with stones and linked by iron chains.

Construction began in 1783 and was completed in 70 years, by three architects - Louis-Alexandre de Cessart, La Bretonnière and Joseph Cachin. The first trunk was laid on 6 June 1784, one kilometre from Île Pelée, and the harbour was filled with 300 to 400 boats ferrying stone from the port at Becquet to the mole to build against the trunks. However, the first trunks were severely damaged by storms. On 22 June 1786 Louis XVI made his only trip away from Paris and Versailles to see how far work on the harbour had progressed and assisted in sinking the ninth stone section. Cessart's plans were finally scotched in 1788, with funding having run out and the French Revolution imminent. This marked a return to La Bretonnière's plan, but in the period between 1789 and 1790 Dumouriez and Cessart left Cherbourg. Subsidies for the project were cut in 1790 and La Bretonnière was forced to hand in his resignation in 1792. Despite a law passed on 1 August 1792 ordering the construction of the military outer port, all works were suspended from 1792 to 1802.

In 1802, intending to make Cherbourg one of his main military ports in preparation for his invasion of the United Kingdom, Napoleon I ordered that work on the harbour wall be resumed to La Bretonnière's plans, by building up the central section to mount cannon. A decree of 25 germinal year XI (1803) ordered the engineer Cachin to excavate the military outer harbour at lac de Moeris - this was opened on 27 August 1813 in the presence of empress Marie-Louise of Austria. That decree also ordered the construction of a new arsenal at the port. 1803 also saw Cherbourg's harbour fend off British attacks and become a base for privateers.

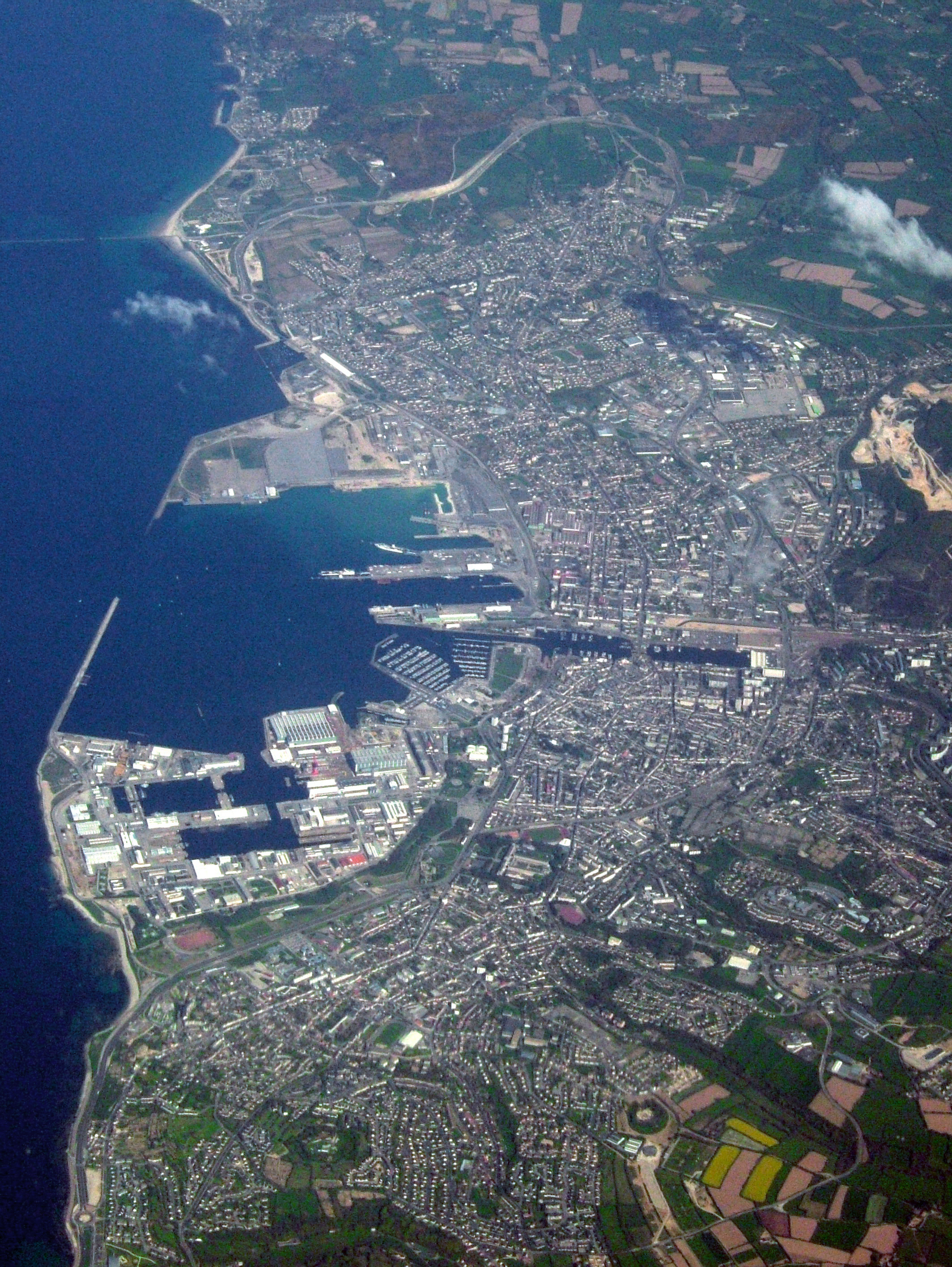
May 2006 aerial view of the Petite Rade (inner harbour) only.

Works on the central wall were again interrupted between 1813 and 1832 and were only finally completed in 1853 under Napoleon III, with the western and eastern harbour walls only completed in 1895. The period also saw the opening of two basins in the naval base—the Charles X basin (begun in 1814; 290×220×18 metres) on 25 August 1829 in the Dauphin's presence, and the Napoléon III basin (begun in 1836; 420×200×18 metres) on 7 August 1858 by Napoleon III and his wife. Work on the harbour was fully completed under the French Third Republic, with the addition of the eastern (1890–1894) and western (1889–1896) walls and the construction of a 'Petite rade' (digue du Hommet, 1899–1914, and digue des Flamands, 1921–1922). Charles Maurice Cabart Danneville made an entry point in the harbour's eastern breakwater, the digue Collignon, so that fishing boats could get out of the harbour rapidly, in case of emergency. That entry point later became the passe Cabart-Danneville. The breakwaters also resisted demolition by the Germans in 1944 during the Battle of Cherbourg.

On April 10, 1912, the British ocean liner RMS Titanic stopped at Cherbourg Harbour on its maiden voyage. The ship was too large to be properly docked there, so passengers were transported to Titanic with the smaller vessels SS Traffic and SS Nomadic. Among these passengers were John Jacob Astor IV and his wife Madeline. The ship would later sink on its voyage.

== Forts ==
=== Fort Chavagnac ===
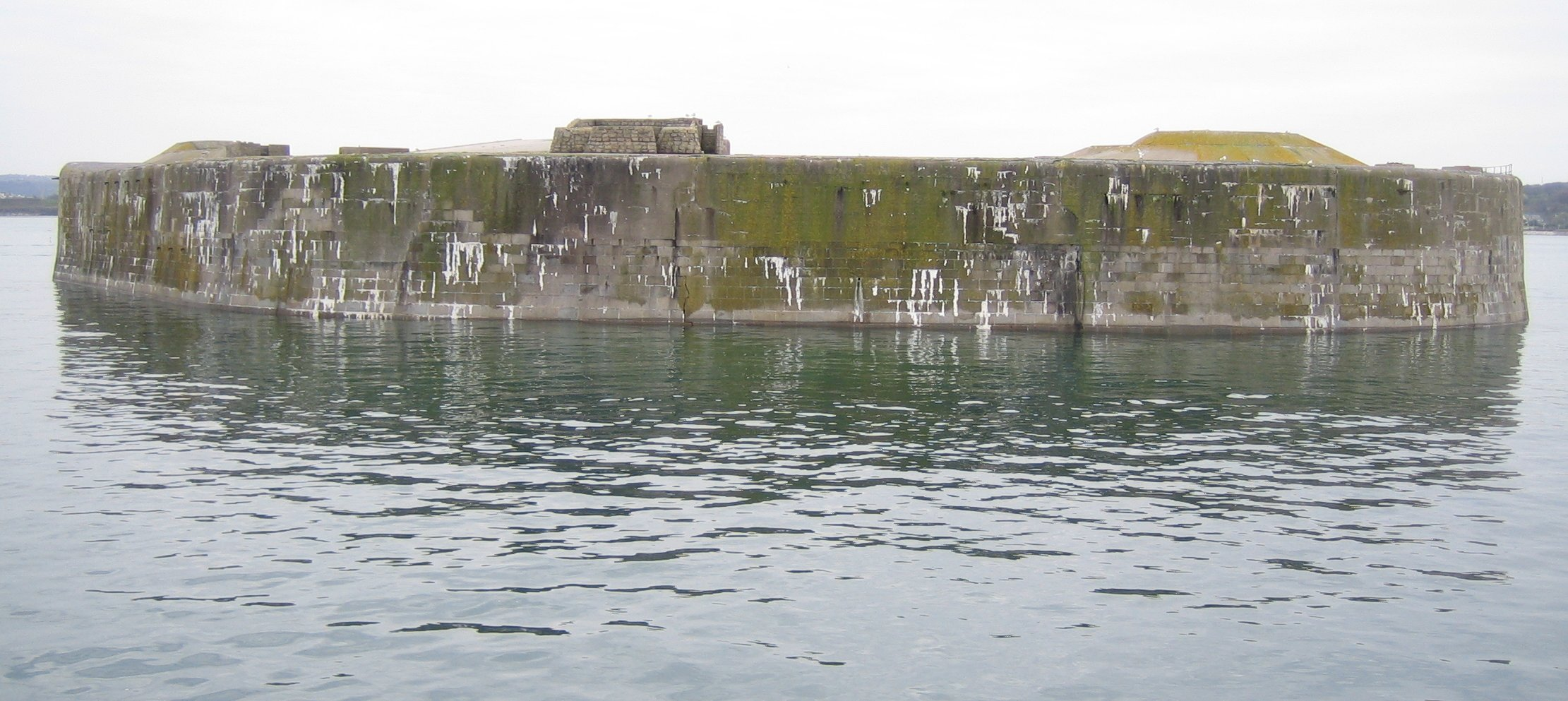
Fort de Chavagnac

=== Fort de l'Est ===
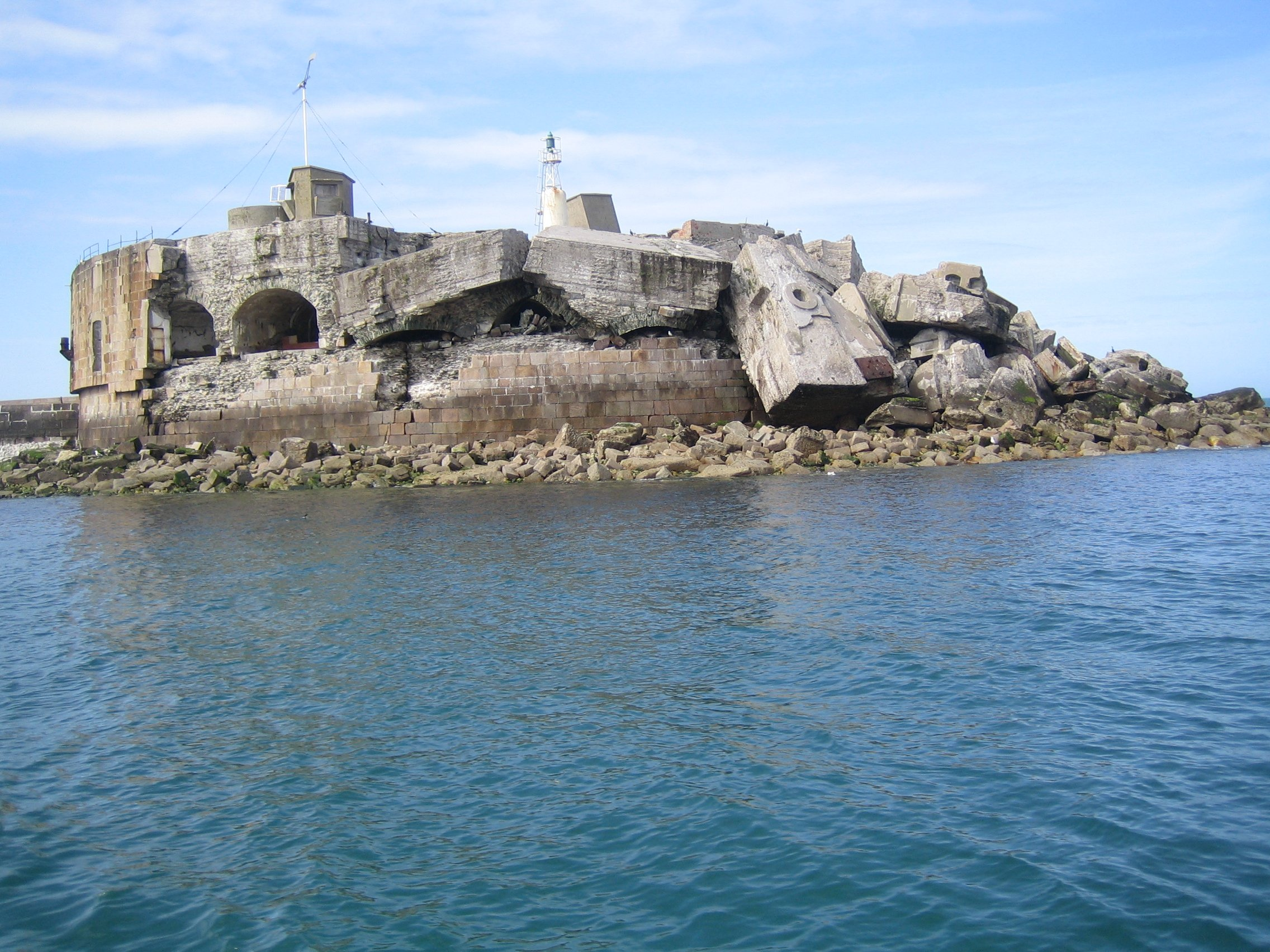
Fort de l'Est, destroyed during the Second World War

=== Fort de l'Ouest ===
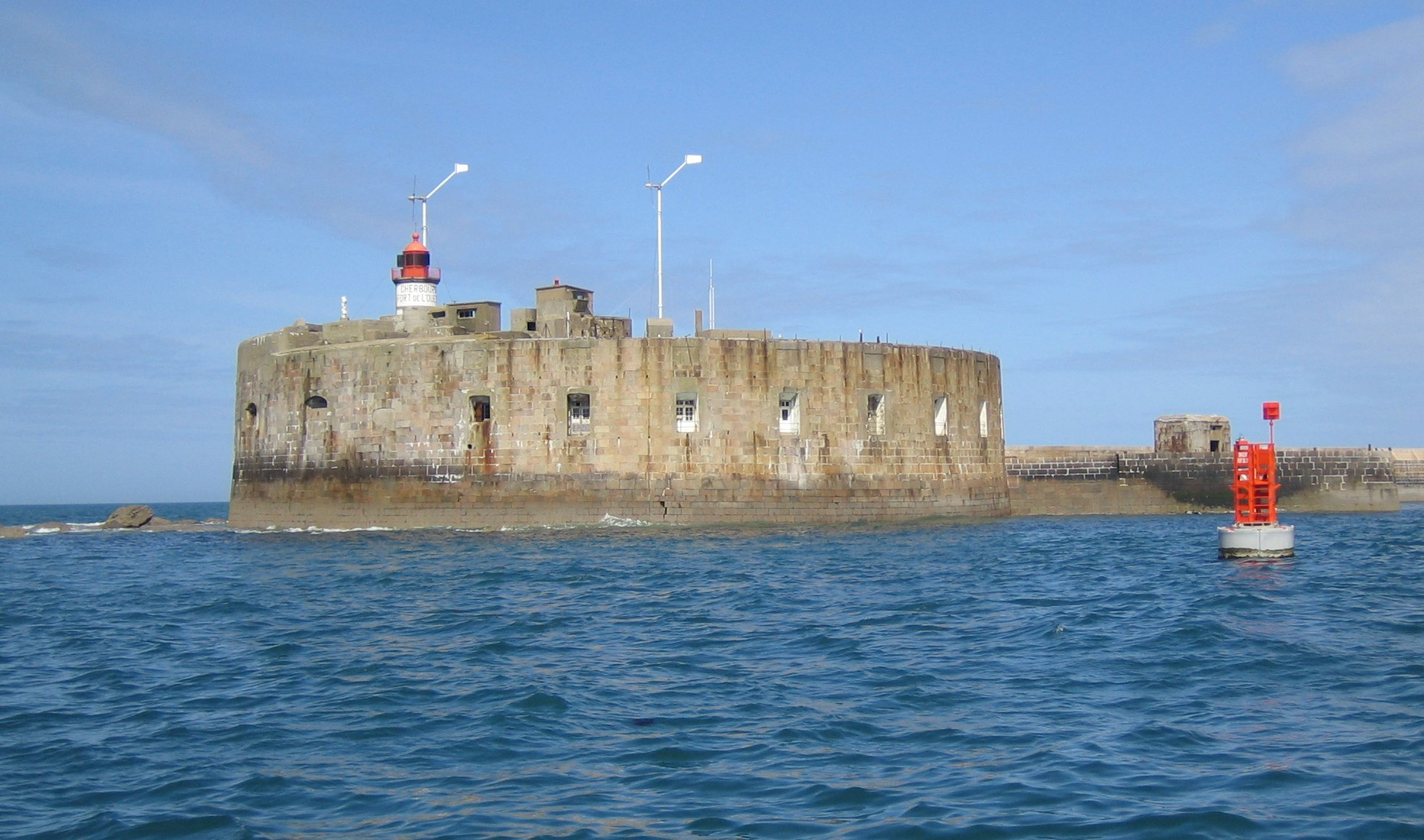
Fort de l'Ouest

=== Central fort ===
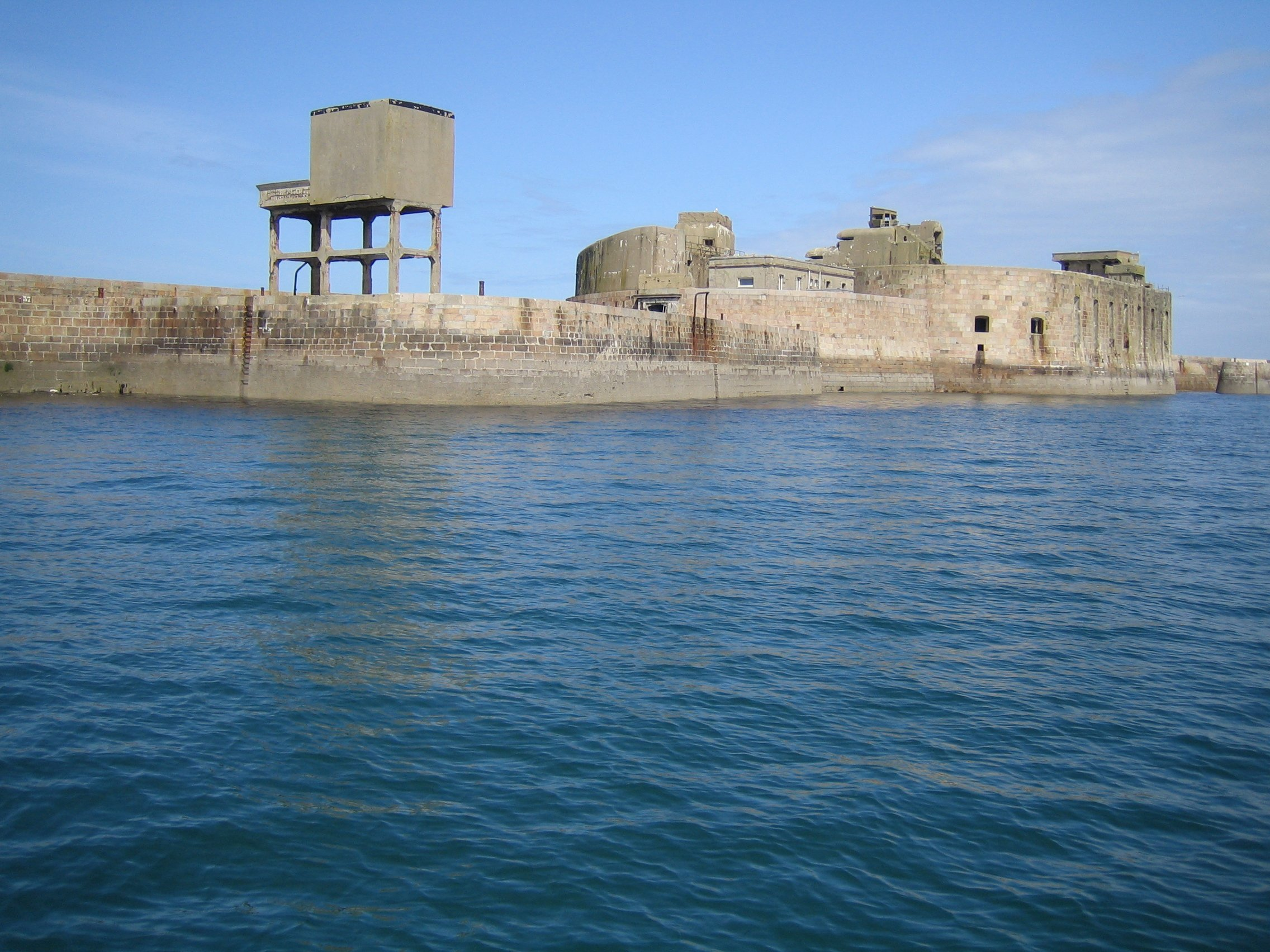
Fort Central

=== Fort de Querqueville ===
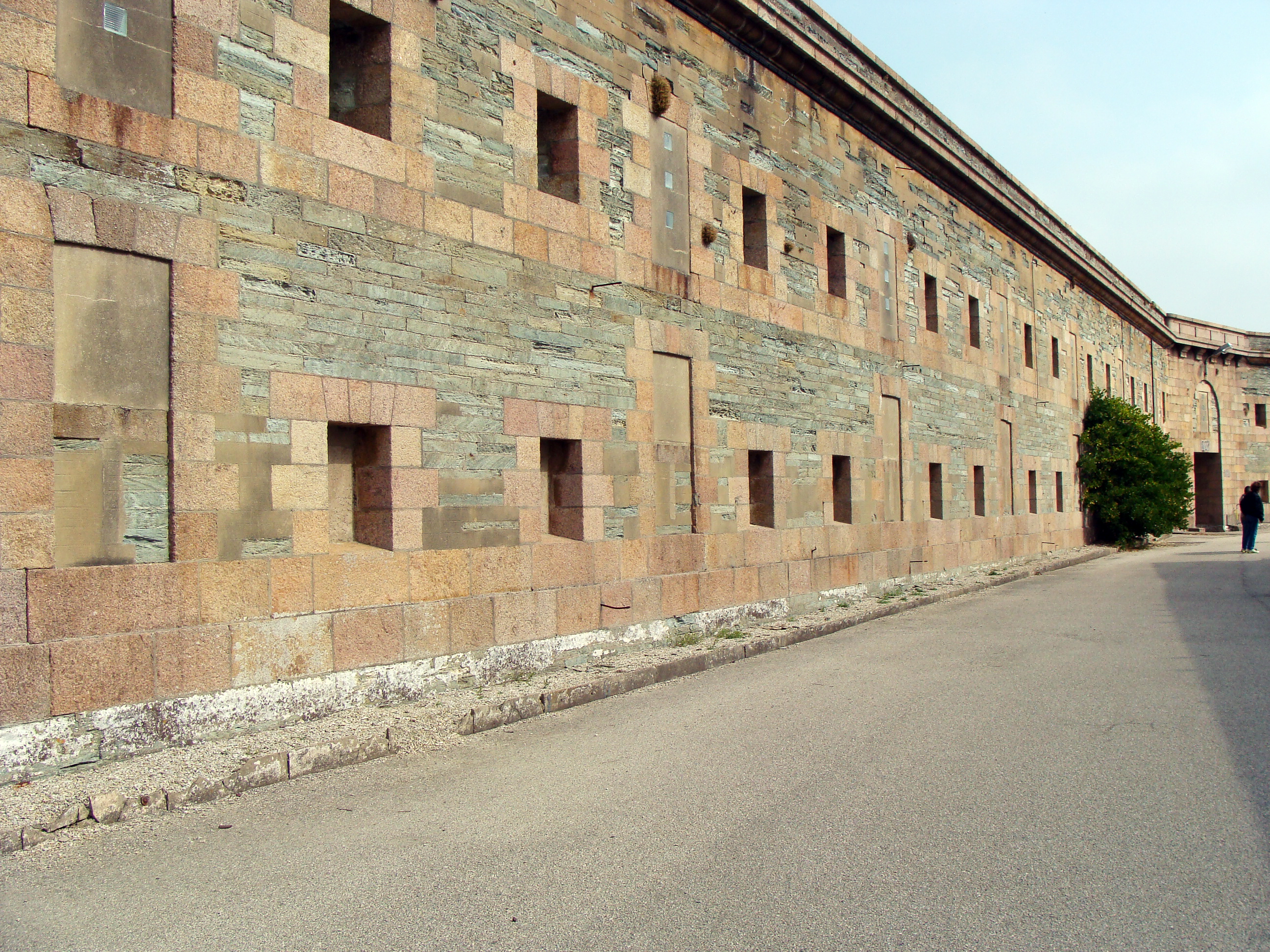
Entrance to the Fort de Querqueville

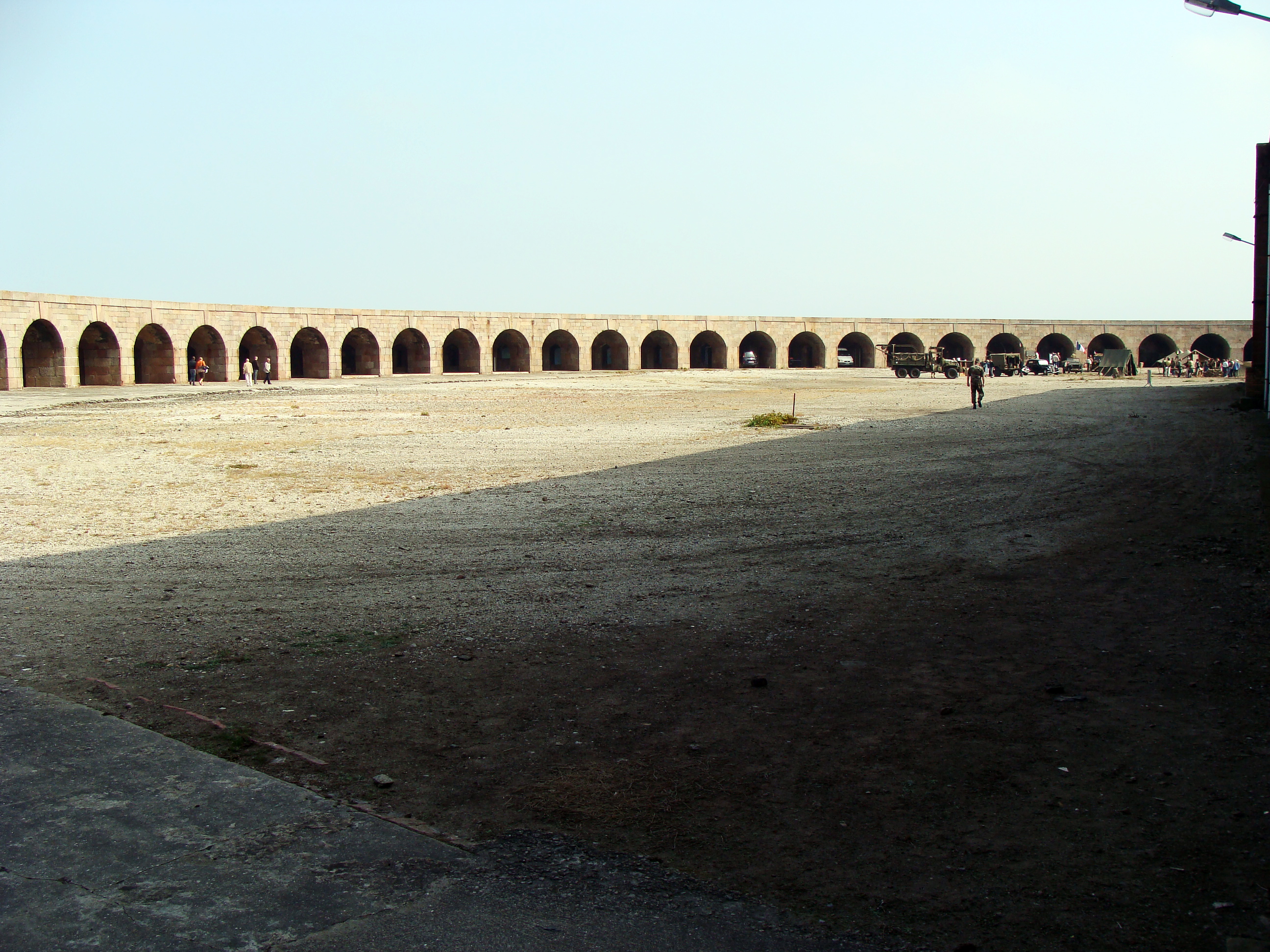
The casemates of Fort de Querqueville

== Gallery ==
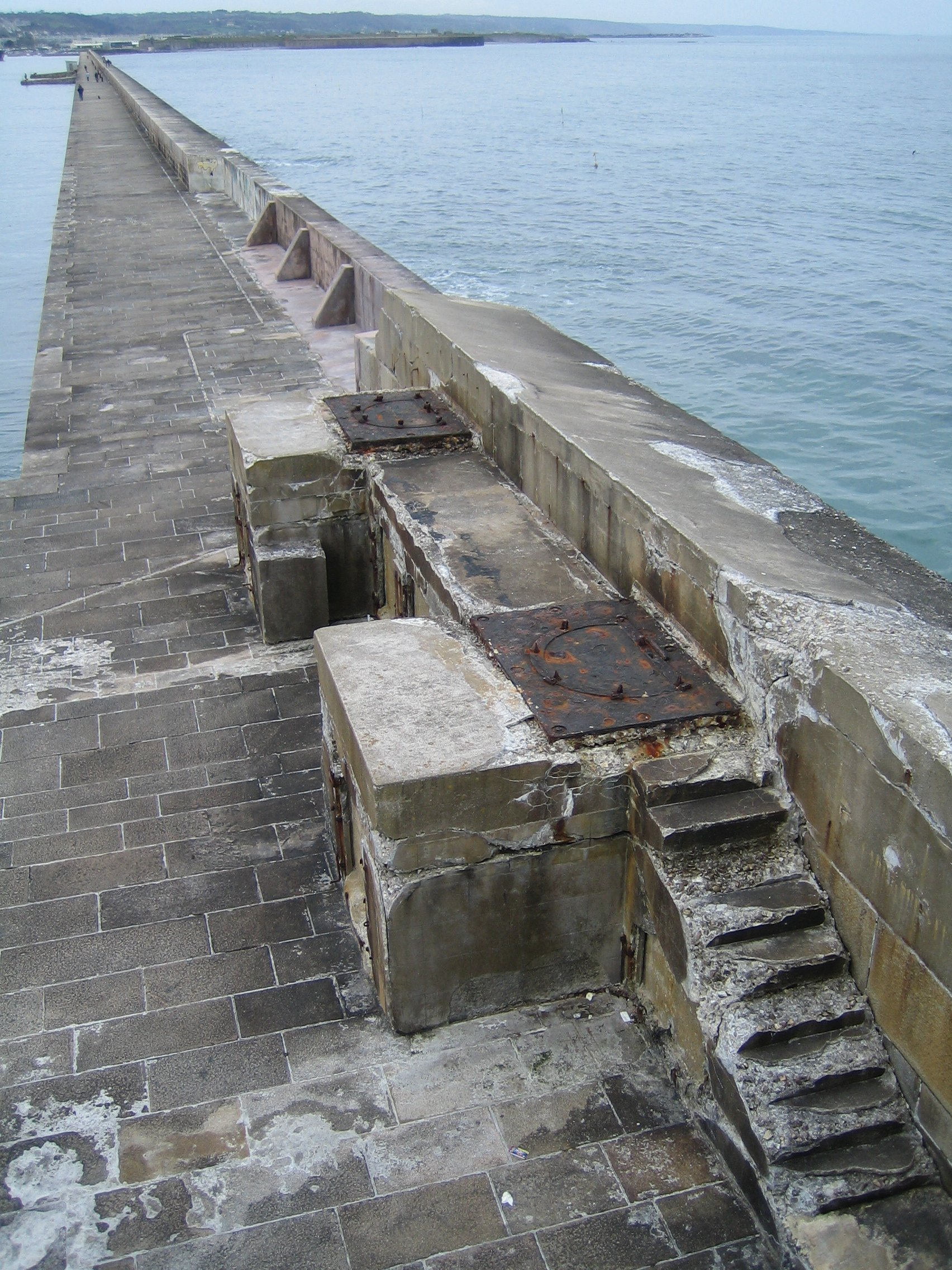
Western wall of the outer harbour

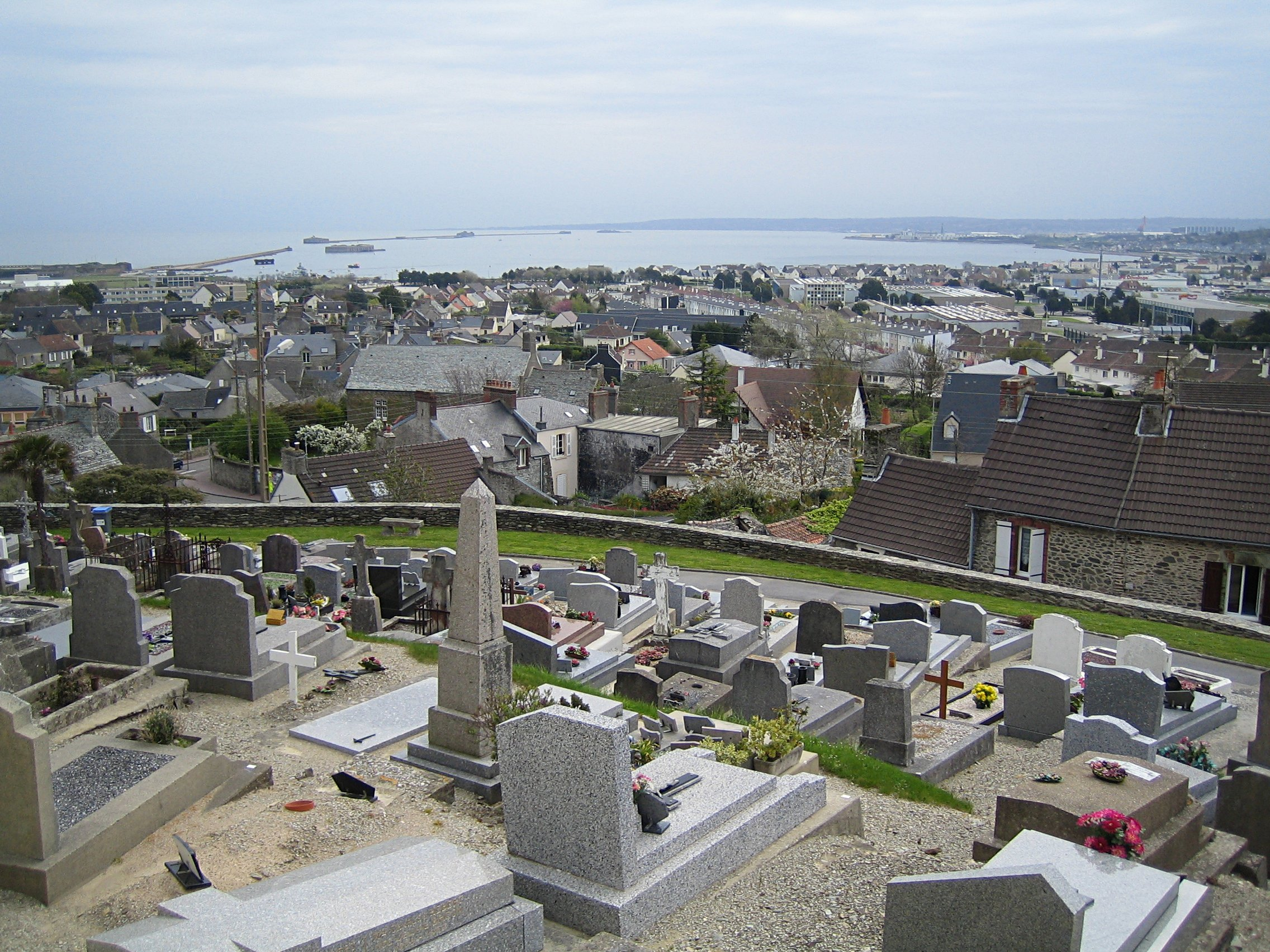
View of the harbour from the cemetery at Querqueville

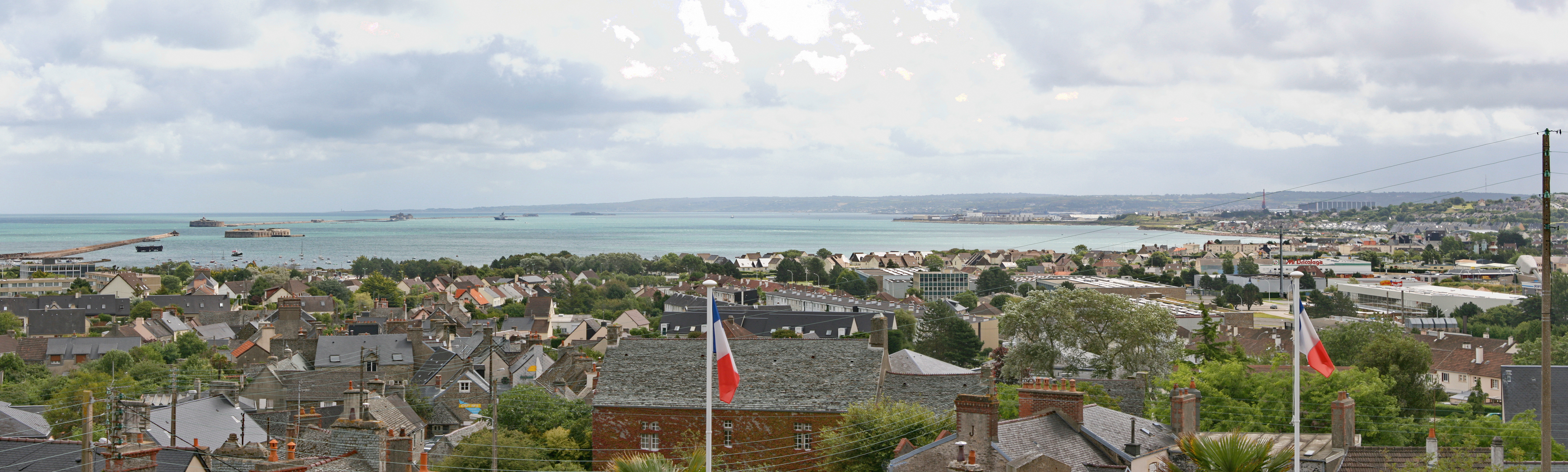
View of the harbour from the cemetery at Querqueville

== General bibliography ==
- (In French) Bazan, "Quels sont les hommes qui ont exercé le plus d'influence sur la création d'un arsenal maritime à Cherbourg et en particulier quelle part doit être attribuée à Vauban dans les projets relatifs à la fermeture de la rade", extract from Séances du congrès scientifique de France, tenu à Cherbourg en septembre 1860. Cherbourg : Auguste Mouchel, 1860. 16 pages
- (In French) Yves Murie, La Digue qui a fait Cherbourg. Cherbourg, Isoète, 2007 - ISBN 978-2-913920-59-0
- (In French) Steve Fraser, Tenter l'Impossible - le projet de la digue de Cherbourg de 1783 a nos jours. Bayeux: OREP éditions, 2024, ISBN 978-2-815-10992-5
