= List of senators of Manche =

Location of Manche in France

Following is a list of senators of Manche, people who have represented the department of Manche in the Senate of France.

== Third Republic ==
Period	Senators
1876-1879	Jules d'Auxais; Napoléon Daru; François Hervé de Saint-Germain
1879-1888	Émile Lenoël; Jules Labiche; Jules Dufresne – Died in 1885; Auguste Sébire – Elected in 1885 to replace Jules Dufresne
1888-1897	Jules Labiche; Hippolyte Morel – Elected in 1890; Émile Lenoël – Died in 1893; Ernest Briens – Elected in 1894; Auguste Sébire – Died in 1895; Charles Maurice Cabart-Danneville – Elected in 1895 to replace Auguste Sébire
1897-1906	Charles Maurice Cabart-Danneville; Hippolyte Morel – Resigned in 1898; Elphège Basire – Elected in 1898 to replace Hippolyte Morel; Jules Labiche – Died in 1905
1906-1920	Elphège Basire – Died in 1917; Charles Maurice Cabart-Danneville – Died in 1918; Adrien Gaudin de Villaine; Émile Riotteau
1920-1924	Émile Damecour; Pierre Dudouyt; Adrien Gaudin de Villaine; Émile Riotteau
1924-1933	Pierre Dudouyt; Émile Riotteau – Died in 1927; Jean Villault-Duchesnois – Elected in 1927 to replace Émile Riotteau; Adrien Gaudin de Villaine – Died in 1930; Maurice Cabart-Danneville – Elected in 1930 to replace Adrien Gaudin de Villaine
1933-1941	Maurice Cabart-Danneville; Jean Villault-Duchesnois; Pierre Dudouyt – Died in 1936; Gustave Guérin – Elected in 1936 to replace Pierre Dudouyt; Émile Damecour – Died in 1940

== Fourth Republic ==
Period	Senators
1946-1948	Joseph Bocher; Stanislas Dadu
1948-1955	Léon Jozeau-Marigné; Michel Yver; Joseph Lecacheux – Died in 1952; Henri Cornat – Elected in 1952 to replace Joseph Lecacheux
1955-1959	Henri Cornat; Léon Jozeau-Marigné; Michel Yver

== Fifth Republic ==
Period	Senators
1959-1965	Henri Cornat; Michel Yver; Léon Jozeau-Marigné
1965-1974	Henri Cornat; René Travert – Elected in 1968 to replace Henri Cornat; Michel Yver – Died; Léon Jozeau-Marigné
1974-1983	Michel Yver – Died in 1979; Auguste Cousin – Elected in 1979 to replace Michel Yver; died in 1982; Jean-François Le Grand – Elected in 1982 to replace Auguste Cousin; Léon Jozeau-Marigné – Resigned in 1983; René Travert
1983-1992	René Travert; Jean-Pierre Tizon; Jean-François Le Grand
1992-2001	Anne Heinis (RI); Jean-François Le Grand (UMP); Jean-Pierre Tizon – Resigned in 1996; Jean Bizet (UMP) – Elected 1996 to replace Jean-Pierre Tizon
2001-2011	Jean Bizet (UMP); Jean-Pierre Godefroy (PS); Jean-François Le Grand (UMP then DVD)
2011-2017	Jean Bizet (UMP); Philippe Bas (UMP); Jean-Pierre Godefroy (PS)
2017-	Philippe Bas (LR); Jean Bizet (LR); Jean-Michel Houllegatte
