= Louis de La Couldre de La Bretonnière =

French naval officer

Louis de La Couldre, Comte de La Bretonnière
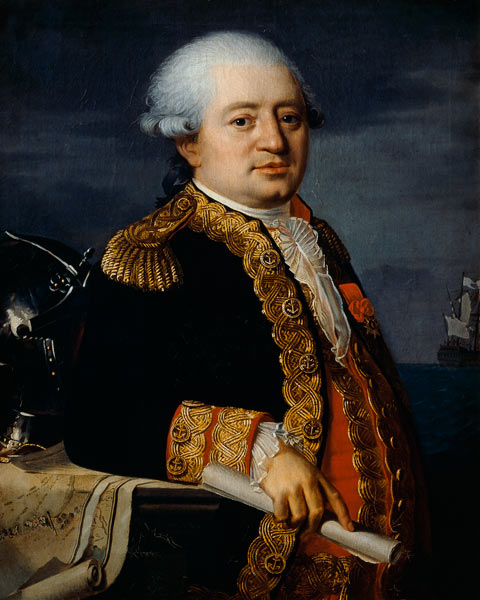
- Louis de La Couldre, Comte de La Bretonnière
- Born: 6/8 July 1741; Château de la Bretonnière, Marchésieux
- Died: 25 November 1809 (aged 67–68); Paris
- Military career
- Allegiance: France
- Branch: Navy
- Service years: 1755–1792
- Commands: Chief Engineer, Cherbourg Harbour
- Conflicts: Seven Years' War; Anglo-French War (1778–1783)

Louis Jean de la Couldre, Comte de La Bretonnière, 6/8 July 1741, to 25 November 1809, was a French naval officer and engineer, who designed Cherbourg Harbour.

He was born at Château de la Bretonnière, Marchésieux, and died in Paris.

== Life ==
He joined the navy aged 14, becoming an officer two years later and fighting in the Seven Years' War and American War of Independence. He was made a captain aged 40 as a reward for his bravery. He was born a viscount, made a count by royal decree in 1787 and made a member of the Order of Cincinnatus, on the recommendation of George Washington. In 1763 he took on important hydrographic work to clarify France's coastal charts.

The duc d'Harcourt, governor of Normandy, and Suffren, Lieutenant général des armées navales, had been ordered by Louis XVI to build a major military port on France's north-west coast. In 1776 they thus put La Bretonnière and Pierre Méchain in charge of perfecting the mapping of the coast between Dunkirk and Granville. In 1777 La Bretonnière filed his report, giving Cherbourg as the best site for such a port and proposing closing off its harbour with a 4 km breakwater made of stone, 4 km from the coast. Sartine then De Castries backed this plan in 1780.

Three years later, those in charge of construction had still not decided on the construction method. La Bretonnière backed sinking old warships and building stone around them, with masonry round the upper part. However, work initially proceeded according to the more innovative plan of Louis-Alexandre de Cessart to sink 90 wooden tree trunks into 20 m high piles and cladding them with stone. In 1784 Cessart was made chief engineer of the project and La Bretonnière returned from America as Cherbourg's naval commander. In June 1786 he received Louis XVI, who had come to take part in sinking the ninth tree trunk of the breakwater. However, Cessart's technique proved unable to bear up to storms and only 20 trunks ended up being sunk before the French Revolution. The project thus returned to La Bretonnière's initial construction method in 1788 and he took over sole control of the project after Cessart and governor Dumouriez left in 1789. In September 1791 the post of naval commander disappeared, forcing La Bretonnière to resign on 8 March 1792.

Denounced by the Montagnards of Valognes, he was imprisoned for two weeks in 1793. Le Carpentier offered to let him rejoin the navy as an ordinary seaman, but he refused and left for Paris. Bonaparte, then first consul, let La Bretonnière back into the navy at the rank of captain in 1803 but refused to let him return to the building project at Cherbourg, instead putting him in command at Boulogne then Dunkirk. Powerless, he retired under the decree of 7 April 1804 and died in Paris five years later aged 68.

== Sources ==
- La Bretonnière, père du port de Cherbourg, La Manche Libre, 16 octobre 2005
- La Bretonnière, inventeur du port de Cherbourg, Reflets, ville de Tourlaville
