= Philippe Bas =

Philippe Bas may refer to:

- Philippe Bas (politician)
- Philippe Bas (actor)
