= Sébire =

Sébire is a French surname that may refer to

- Chantal Sébire (1955–2008), French teacher
- Gaston Sébire (1920–2001), French painter
- Auguste Sébire (1807–1895), French politician and physician
