= French minesweeper Vulcain =

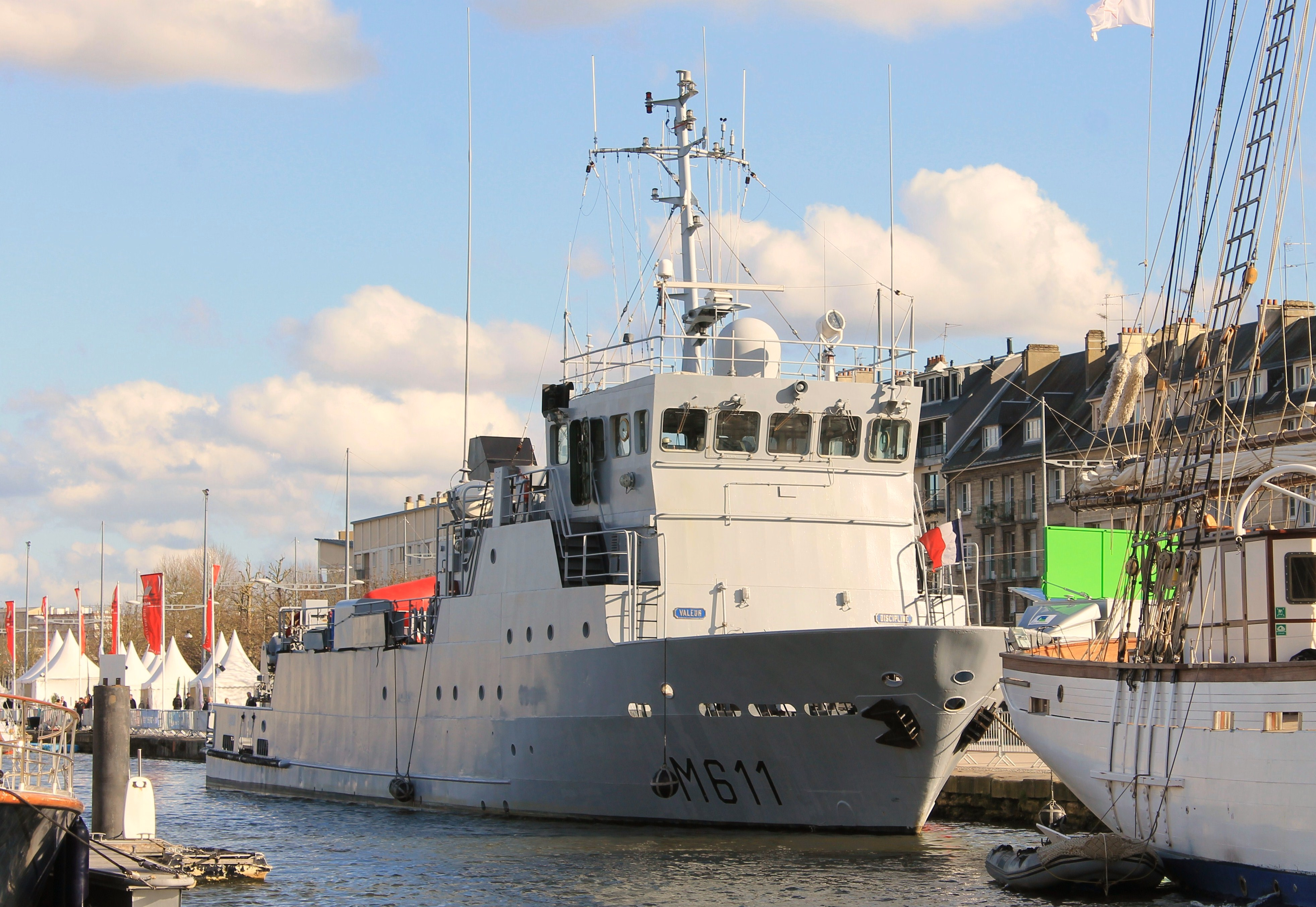
- Vulcain at Caen in 2013

History

France
- Name: Vulcain
- Builder: Chantiers et ateliers de la Perrière, Lorient
- Laid down: 15 May 1985
- Launched: 17 January 1986
- Commissioned: 11 October 1986
- Identification: MMSI number: 227800300; Callsign: FYCL; Pennant number: M611
- Status: Active in service

General characteristics
- Type: Vulcain-class minesweeper
- Tonnage: 490 DWT
- Displacement: 409 tonnes
- Length: 41.6 m (136 ft 6 in)
- Beam: 7.5 m (24 ft 7 in)
- Draught: 3.20 m (10 ft 6 in)
- Installed power: 2,200 hp
- Propulsion: 2 × SACM-Wärtsilä diesel engines; 1 × bow thruster (70 hp)
- Speed: 13.5 knots (25.0 km/h; 15.5 mph)
- Range: 7,400 nmi (13,700 km; 8,500 mi) at 9 kn (17 km/h; 10 mph); 2,850 nmi (5,280 km; 3,280 mi) at 13.5 kn (25.0 km/h; 15.5 mph)
- Complement: 1 officer; 10 petty officers; Quartermasters and sailors
- Armament: 2 × AA-52 machine guns

Vulcain (M611) is a Vulcain-class minesweeper of the French Navy. She is classed by the French Navy as a BBPD type vessel (French: bâtiment-base de plongeurs démineurs) and is used as a base ship for clearance divers.

== Construction and career ==
Vulcain was launched on 17 January 1986 and commissioned on 11 October. She is based in Cherbourg Naval Base, in Cherbourg, France, and is run by the 1st GPD Groupement de Plongeurs démineurs, a group of French Army clearance divers. Since 16 May 1987, she has been symbolically linked with the town of Honfleur. The personnel on board usually comprises 12 divers, 1 medical officer and 1 nurse.

Other BBPDs of the Vulcain type are:

- BBPD Styx - M614
- BBPD Pluton - M622
- BBPD Achéron - A613

== See also ==
- List of active French Navy ships

== Bibliography ==
- Jordan, John (1995). "France". In Chumbley, Stephen (ed.). Conway's All The World's Fighting Ships 1947–1995. Annapolis, Maryland: Naval Institute Press. pp. 95–131. ISBN 1-55750-132-7.
- Saunders, Stephen, ed. (2004). Jane's Fighting Ships 2004–2005. Coulsdon, UK: Jane's Information Group. ISBN 0-7106-2623-1.
