= Jean-Baptiste de Voglie =

Italian engineer (c. 1723–1777)

- Born: 1723 or 1724
- Died: October 1777
- Other name: Jean Bentivoglio
- Occupations: Road and bridge engineer

Jean-Baptiste de Voglie (1723/24 – October 1777), born Jean Bentivoglio was an Italian road and bridge engineer.

== Career ==
Descended from the Ferrara branch of the Bentivoglio, Jean de Voglie entered the Corps of Bridges and Roads in France in 1742 and was appointed under-engineer to Jean-Rodolphe Perronet at Alençon. He was made inspector-general in 1773. He was placed in charge of construction of the bridge at Tours that was given to him on the death of Mathieu Bayeux (born 1723).

De Voglie designed and built the bridge at Saumur, though for an unknown reason this bears the name of his collaborator Louis-Alexandre de Cessart.

Perronet's designated successor as first engineer and director, de Voglie died prematurely of illness before he could succeed him. The architect François-Michel Lecreulx (1729–1812) (de Voglie's longtime boss at Saumur) said of him that "No one possessed a great spirit of conciliation in business than he did; no one was more intelligent in combining under all the faces nor more proper in seizing the convenient moment for his success. He brought together indefatigable activity with a singular facility for its use."

De Voglie wrote an article on bridge construction for Denis Diderot's and Jean le Rond d'Alembert's Encyclopédie ou Dictionnaire raisonné des sciences, des arts et des métiers, and they also relied on his memory for the volumes on planks.
