= Joseph Cachin =

French engineer

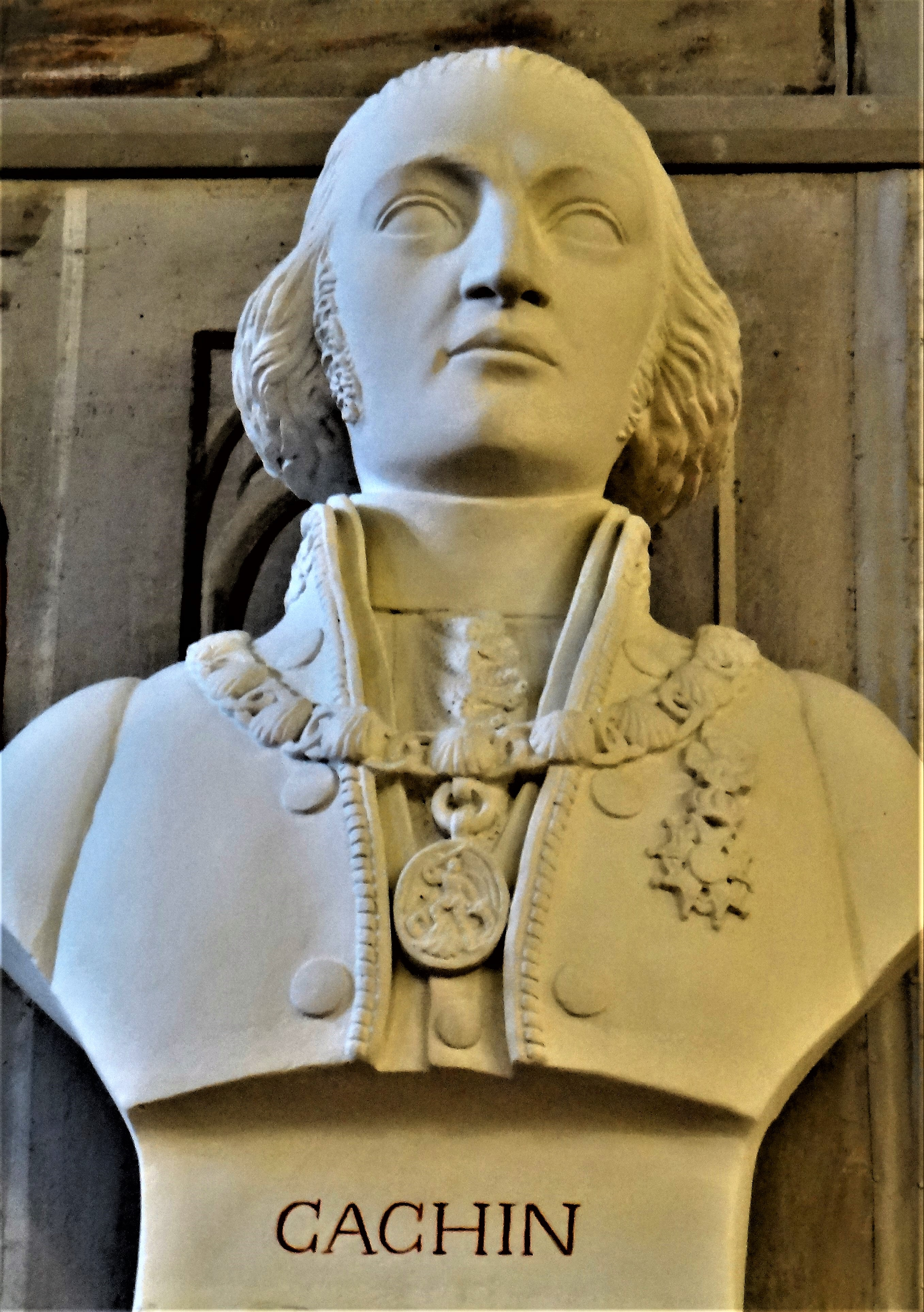

Baron Joseph Marie François Cachin was a French engineer, most notable for his work at Cherbourg Harbour. He was born in Castres on October 2, 1757 and died in Paris on February 23, 1825.

== Biography ==
Joseph Cachin, son of Pierre Cachin, was a butler at the episcopal palace of Chastres. Under the protection of the Bishop of Castres, Jean-Sébastien de Barral, he went to school at les frères de Chastres and later at le collège de Sorèze. He went on to study architecture at l’école des beaux-arts de Toulouse and, in 1776, joined l’école des ponts et chaussées in Paris, under the supervision of Jean-Rodolphe Perronet. Upon graduation, he spent some time travelling in England and the United States.

Shortly afterwards, Joseph Cachin became an engineer for the maritime works in the généralité of Rouen, where he was put in charge of improving the Port of Honfleur. In this position, he proposed the construction of a canal that would run parallel to the Seine River, between Quillebeuf and the sea, to protect incoming merchant ships. From 1790 to 1792, he was elected to the head of the municipality by the French Revolution, but further planning of his canal project was halted, due to lack of funds. Here, he married the wealthy Judith de la Rivière, the third widow of the Prince of Montbéliard; however, their marriage was short-lived and they separated shortly afterwards, by mutual agreement.

In 1792, he was appointed chief engineer of Calvados, where he worked on the Caen Canal and the establishment of the navy between Colleville and the mouth of the Orne River. Later that year, he took part in the committee that was in charge of planning Cherbourg Harbour; however, the project was soon suspended after the fall of the monarchy.

Joseph Cachin left Calvados after the 18 Brumaire coup d’état and entered the marine services, as head of maritime works. In July 1802, after becoming Inspector General of roads and bridges, he renewed his interest in Cherbourg Harbour and published a rapport in le Moniteur: recommending the construction of a port (at pointe du Hommet) and a central defense battery to increase the protection of the harbour (until then provided by the forts at Querqueville and Pelée island). As a result of this publication, in 1804, Napoleon appointed him as director general of maritime works of Cherbourg. In the same year, he joined the conseil général de la Manche, which he would later chair. Over the span of 20 years, he completed many works at Cherbourg: including fortifications of the harbour wall; improvements to the commercial port; construction of the defense battery; and digging of the naval base, which would make up the new armoury.

On September 16, 1808, Joseph Cachin received the title Knight of the Empire by letters patent. He became baron on August 27, 1816 and was awarded Officer of the Legion of Honour by Empress Marie-Louis at the inauguration of the new military harbour in Cherbourg. In 1816, after the completion of the Port of Cherbourg, he became a candidate for the chamber of deputies, but was not elected. He published his last book in 1820, entitled Mémoire sur la digue de Cherbourg comparée au breakwater de Plymouth. In 1823, he left his position in Cherbourg and died shortly afterwards from a stroke at the hôtel des Monnaies in Paris.

== Literary Posterity ==
Joseph Cachin was later described as an architectural genius by Honoré de Balzac in Le Curé de village:

"Cachin, the man of genius to whom we owe Cherbourg (…) Genius only obeys its own laws, it only develops out of circumstances over which man has no control – neither the State, nor the science of mankind, Anthropology, know them. Riquet, Perronet, Leonardo da Vinci, Cachin, Palladio, Brunelleschi, Michelangelo, Bramante, Vauban, Vicat held their genius due to unobserved reasons and causes to which we give the name of chance, the great word of fools."
