= Jean-François Le Grand =

French politician

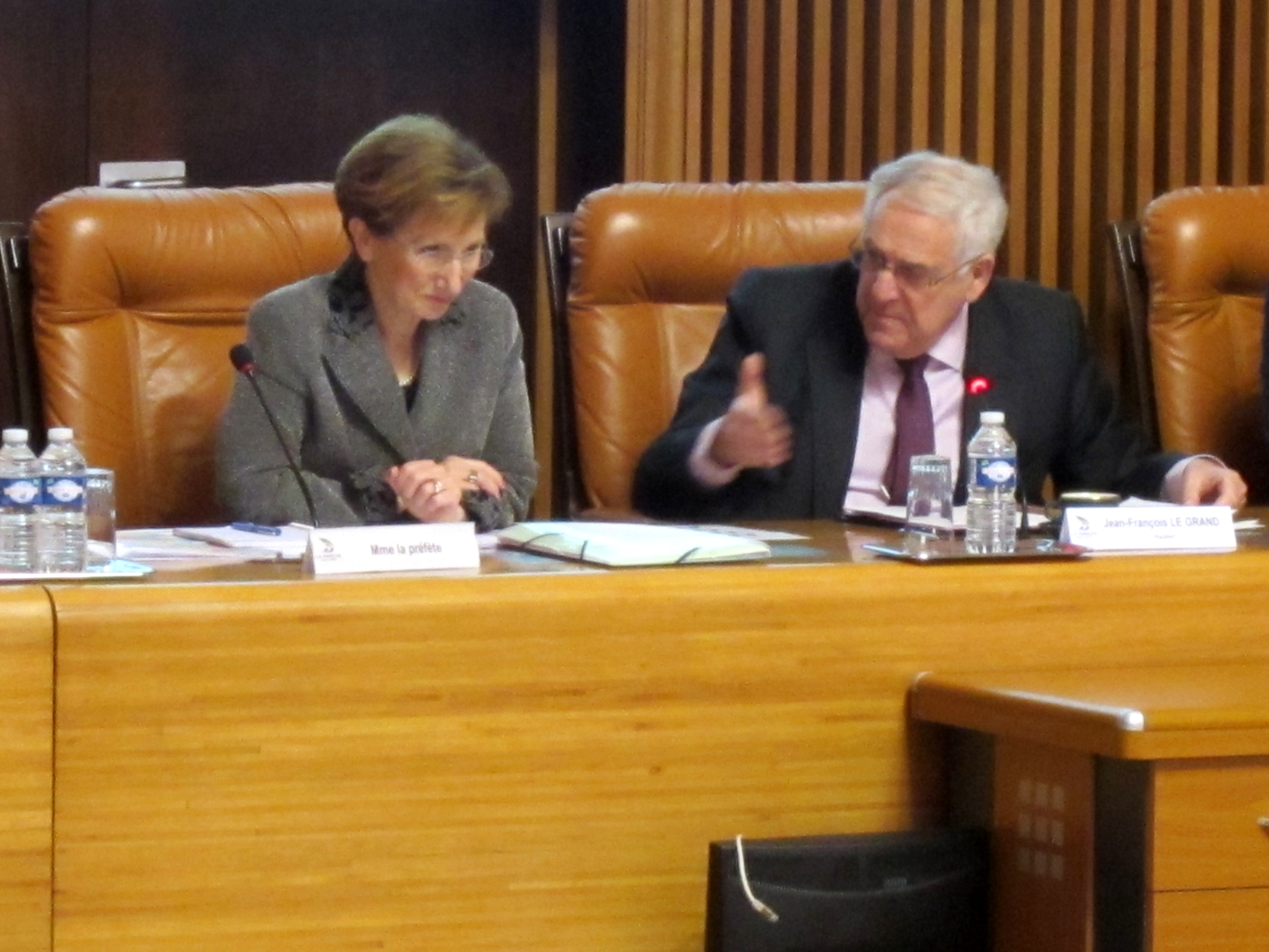

President of the General council of Manche
- In office 1998–2015
- Preceded by: Pierre Aguiton
- Succeeded by: Philippe Bas

Member of the French Senate for Manche
- In office 1982–2011
- Succeeded by: Philippe Bas

Personal details
- Born: 8 June 1942 (age 83) Lessay, France
- Party: Independent
- Profession: Veterinarian

Jean-François Le Grand (French pronunciation: [ʒɑ̃ fʁɑ̃swa lə ɡʁɑ̃]; born 8 June 1942 in Lessay, Manche) is a French politician and a former member of the Senate of France. He represented the Manche department as a member of the Union for a Popular Movement Party.
