= Jean Bizet =

French politician

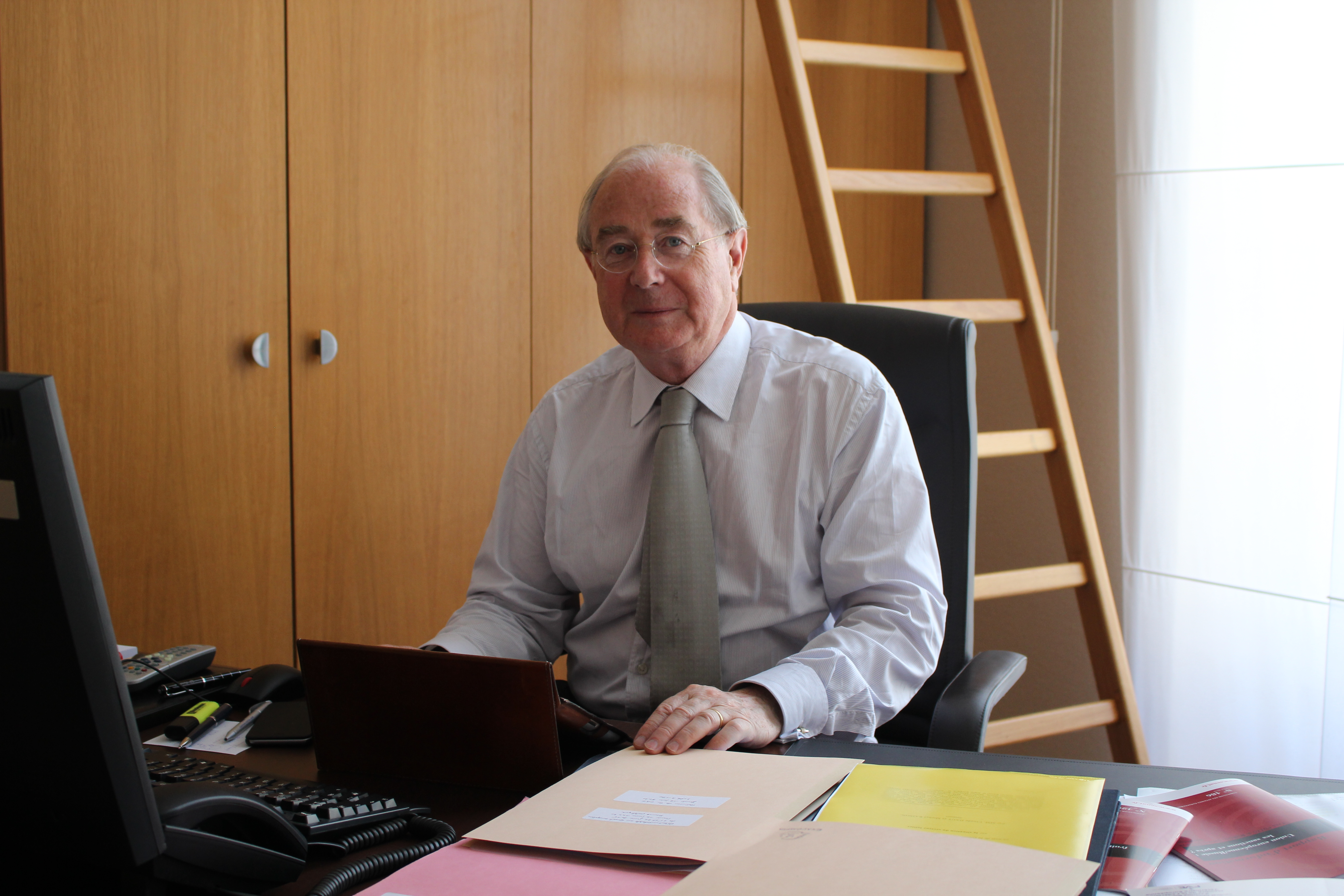
- Jean Bizet in 2015

Member of the French Senate for Manche
- In office 7 July 1996 – 30 September 2020
- Preceded by: Jean-Pierre Tizon
- Succeeded by: Valérie Blandin

Mayor of Le Teilleul
- In office 6 March 1983 – 16 March 2014
- Preceded by: Geneviève Leconte
- Succeeded by: Véronique Künkel

Personal details
- Born: 30 August 1947 (age 78) Le Teilleul, Manche, France
- Party: The Republicans
- Education: Lycée Chateaubriand
- Alma mater: École Nationale Vétérinaire d'Alfort
- Profession: Veterinarian

Jean Bizet (born 30 August 1947) is a French politician of The Republicans who served as a member of the Senate of France, representing the Manche department between 1996 and 2020. Since March 2010, he is the chairman of the European Affairs Committee.

In the Republicans’ 2016 presidential primaries, Bizet endorsed Nicolas Sarkozy as the party's candidate for the office of President of France.
