= Marchésieux =

- Commune
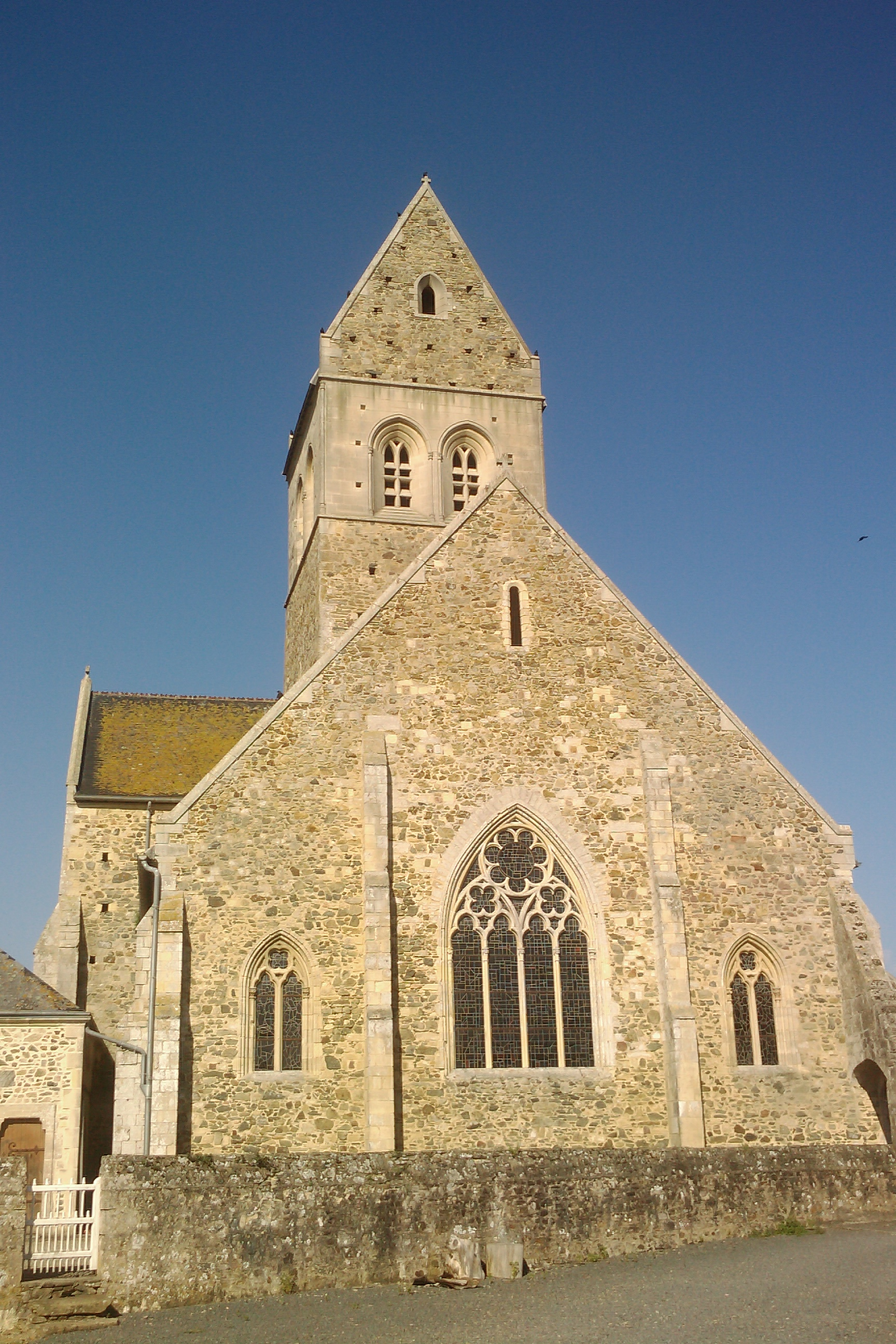
- The church of Saint-Manvieu

- Coat of arms
- Location of Marchésieux
- Location within France Location within Normandy
- Coordinates: 49°11′18″N 1°17′24″W
- Country: France
- Region: Normandy
- Department: Manche
- Arrondissement: Coutances
- Canton: Agon-Coutainville

Government
  - Mayor (2020–2026): Anne Hebert
- Area^{1}: 19.89 km^{2} (7.68 sq mi)
- Elevation: 24 m (79 ft)
- Highest elevation: 22 m (72 ft)
- Lowest elevation: 0 m (0 ft)
- Population (2023): 665
  - Density: 33.4/km^{2} (86.6/sq mi)
- Time zone: UTC+01:00 (CET)
  - Summer (DST): UTC+02:00 (CEST)
- INSEE/Postal code: 50289 /50190
- ^{1} French Land Register data, which excludes lakes, ponds, glaciers > 1 km^{2} (0.386 sq mi or 247 acres) and river estuaries.

Marchésieux (French pronunciation: [maʁʃezjø]) is a commune in the Manche department in Normandy in north-western France.

The commune lies on the border between the Coutançais and the Pays saint-lois, south of the Cotentin and Bessin Marshes Regional Nature Park. Its town centre is 9.5 km east of Périers, 13 km north of Marigny, 16 km south of Carentan, 20 km northwest of Saint-Lô, and 21 km northeast of Coutances.

== See also ==
- Communes of the Manche department
