= Philippe Bas (politician) =

French politician (born 1958)

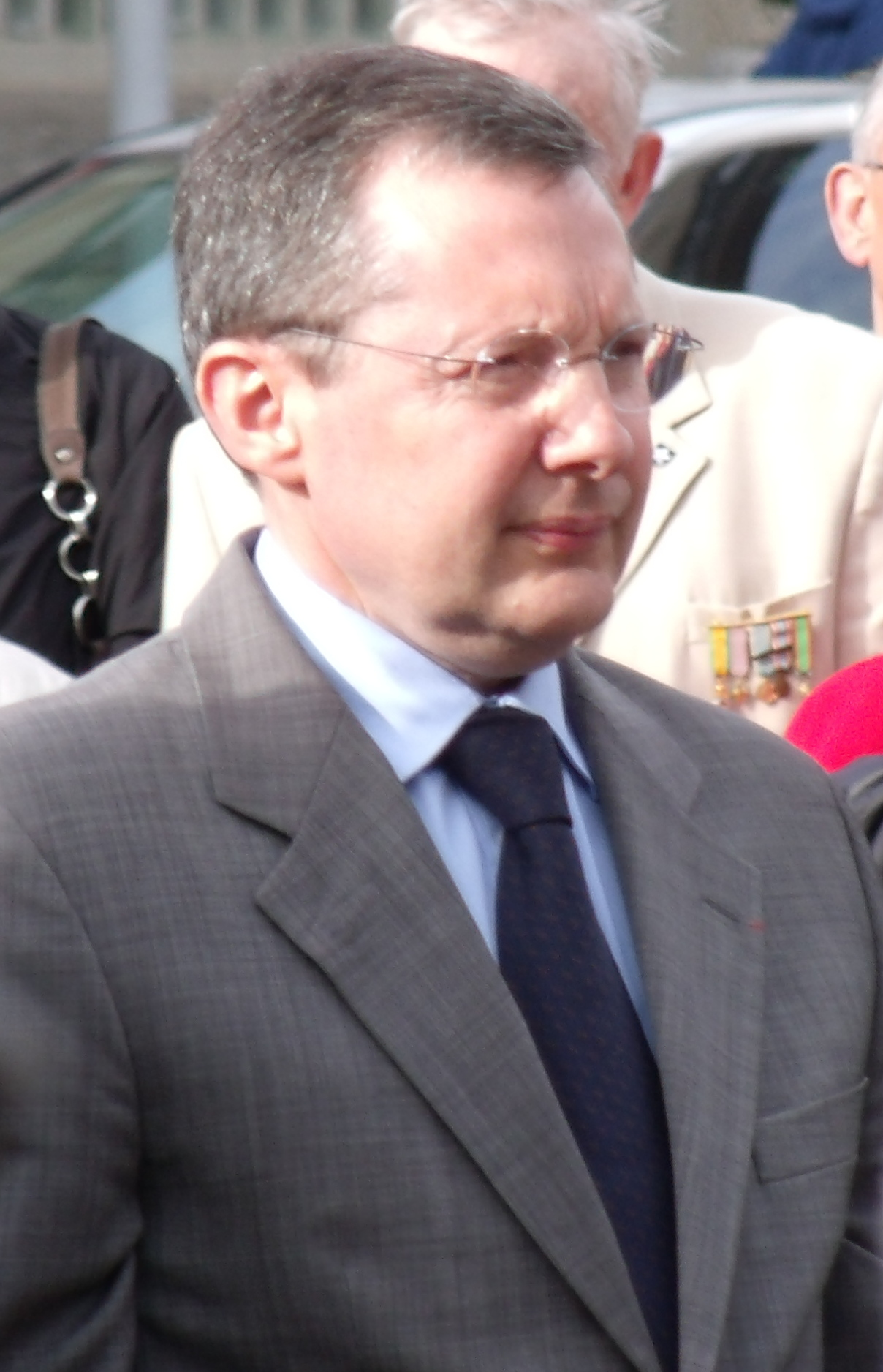
- Bas in 2012

Member of the Constitutional Council
- Incumbent
- Assumed office 8 March 2025
- Appointed by: Gérard Larcher
- President: Richard Ferrand
- Preceded by: Michel Pinault

Member of the French Senate for Manche
- In office 1 October 2011 – 8 March 2025
- Preceded by: Jean-François Le Grand

President of the Departemental Council of Manche
- In office 2 April 2015 – 9 October 2017
- Preceded by: Jean-François Le Grand
- Succeeded by: Marc Lefèvre

Chief of Staff of President of France
- In office 2002–2005
- President: Jacques Chirac
- Preceded by: Dominique de Villepin
- Succeeded by: Frédéric Salat-Baroux

Personal details
- Born: 20 July 1958 (age 68) Paris, France
- Party: The Republicans
- Education: Sciences Po, ÉNA

Philippe Bas (French pronunciation: [filip ba]; born 20 July 1958) is a French politician, serving as a Member of the Constitutional Council since 2025. He is a former member of the French Senate representing the department of Manche from 2011 to 2025.

He was appointed general secretary of the Élysée Palace from 2002 to 2005. Since 2014, he is the president of the Commission des Lois in the French Senate. Between July 2018 and February 2019, he was the president of the Senate commission which investigated the Benalla affair, chiefly on the organization of the French presidency about security subjects.
