= Querqueville =

- Part of Cherbourg-en-Cotentin
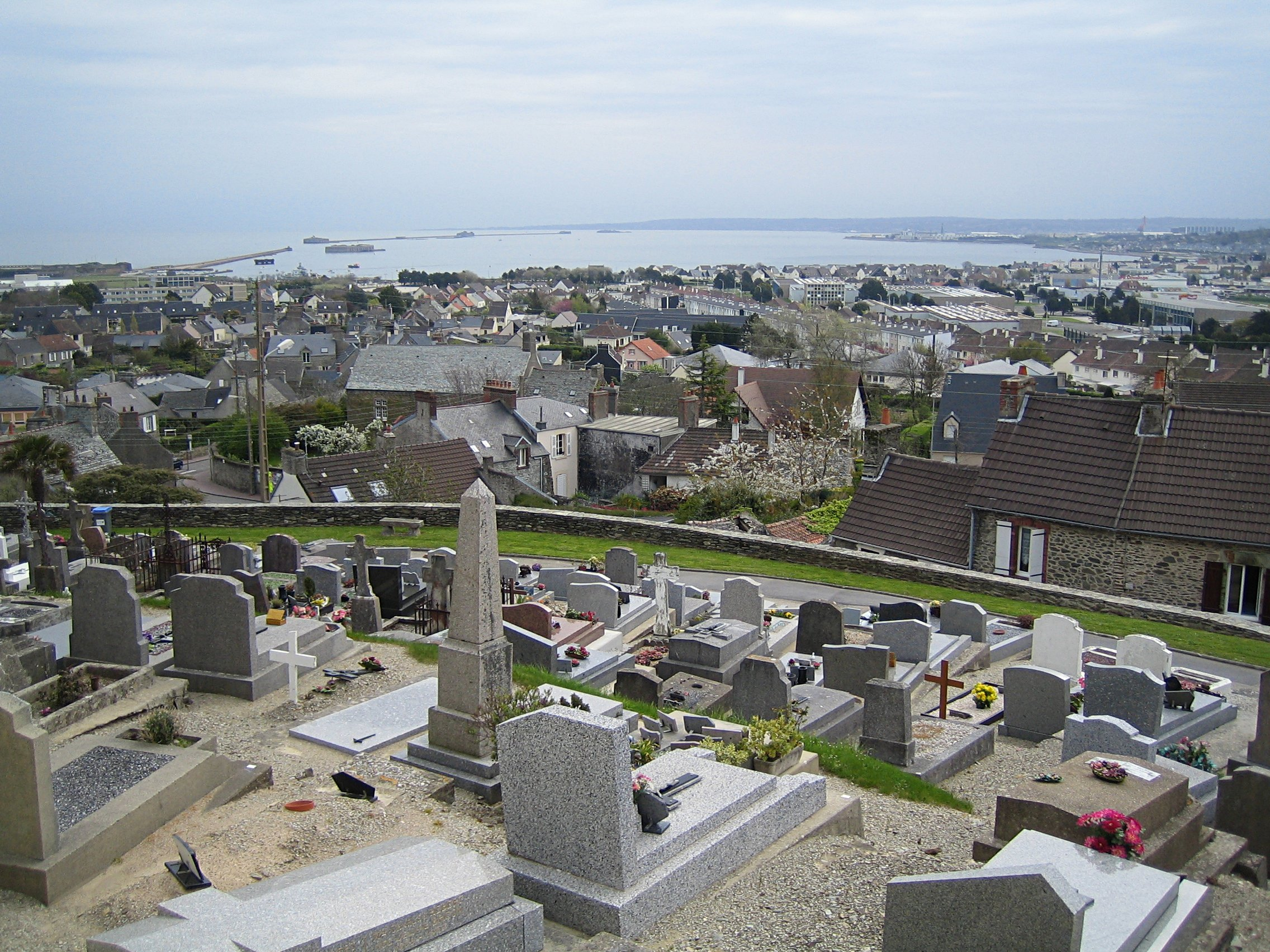
- View of the cemetery

- Coat of arms
- Location of Querqueville
- Location within France Location within Normandy
- Coordinates: 49°39′51″N 1°41′38″W
- Country: France
- Region: Normandy
- Department: Manche
- Arrondissement: Cherbourg
- Canton: La Hague
- Commune: Cherbourg-en-Cotentin
- Area^{1}: 5.56 km^{2} (2.15 sq mi)
- Elevation: 50 m (160 ft)
- Highest elevation: 115 m (377 ft)
- Lowest elevation: 0 m (0 ft)
- Population (2022): 4,957
  - Density: 892/km^{2} (2,310/sq mi)
- Demonym: Querquevillais
- Time zone: UTC+01:00 (CET)
  - Summer (DST): UTC+02:00 (CEST)
- Postal code: 50460
- Website: www.ville-querqueville.fr
- ^{1} French Land Register data, which excludes lakes, ponds, glaciers > 1 km^{2} (0.386 sq mi or 247 acres) and river estuaries.

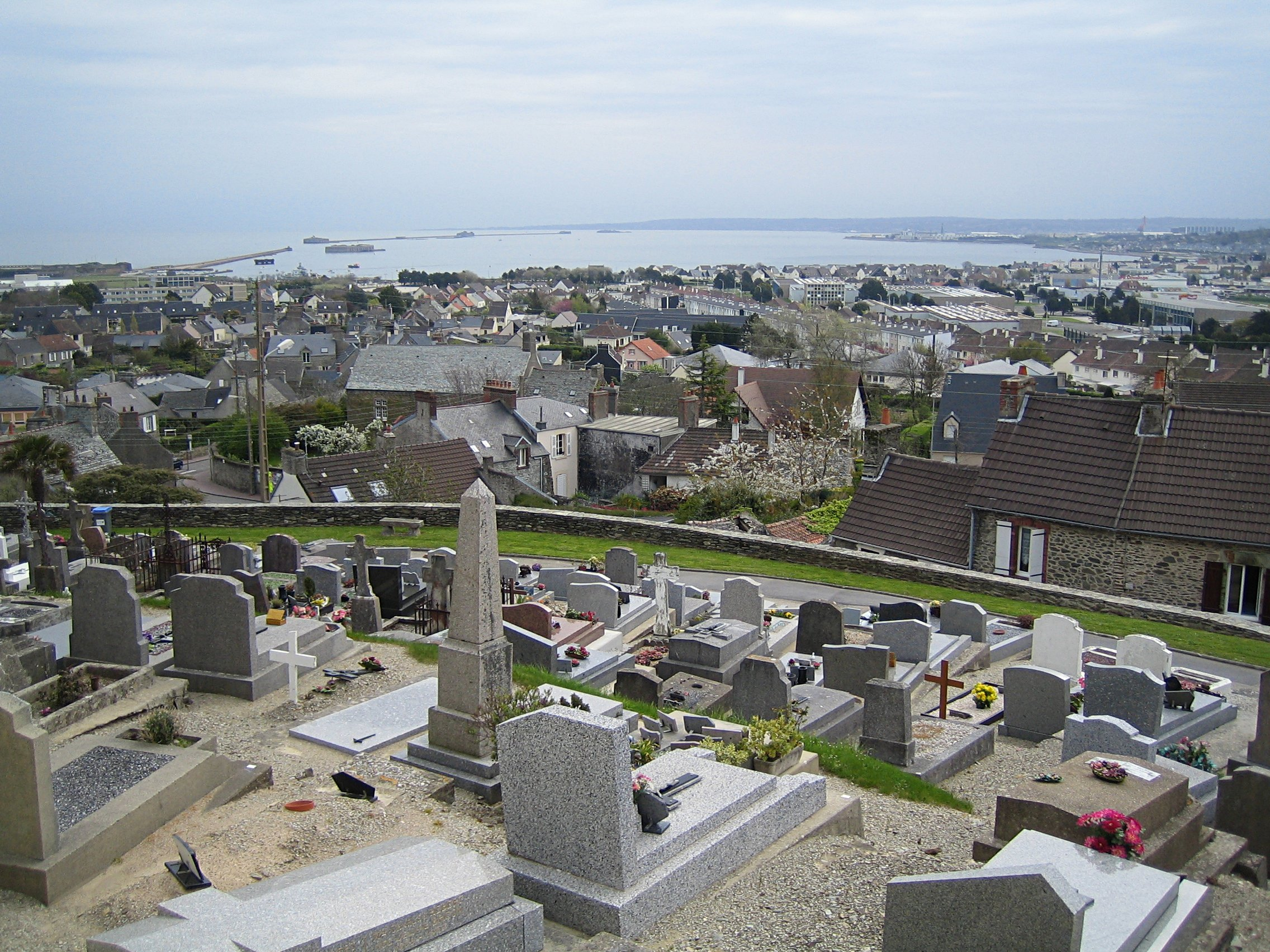
View of Querqueville from the cemetery

Querqueville (French pronunciation: [kɛʁkəvil]) is a former commune in the Manche department in north-western France. On 1 January 2016, it was merged into the new commune of Cherbourg-en-Cotentin.

The Chapel of Saint Germanus (Chapelle Saint-Germain) with its trefoil floorplan incorporates elements of one of the earliest surviving places of Christian worship in the Cotentin Peninsula - perhaps second only to the Gallo-Roman baptistry at Port-Bail.

== Heraldry ==
Arms of Querqueville	The arms of Querqueville are blazoned: Gules, a trefoil chapel Or, pierced and open sable, on a chief azure, three bees Or.

== History ==
During WII, Querqueville Airfield (Advanced Landing Ground) was rebuilt on a former French Navy airfield.

== See also ==
- Communes of the Manche department
