= Charles Maurice Cabart-Danneville =

French politician (1846–1918)

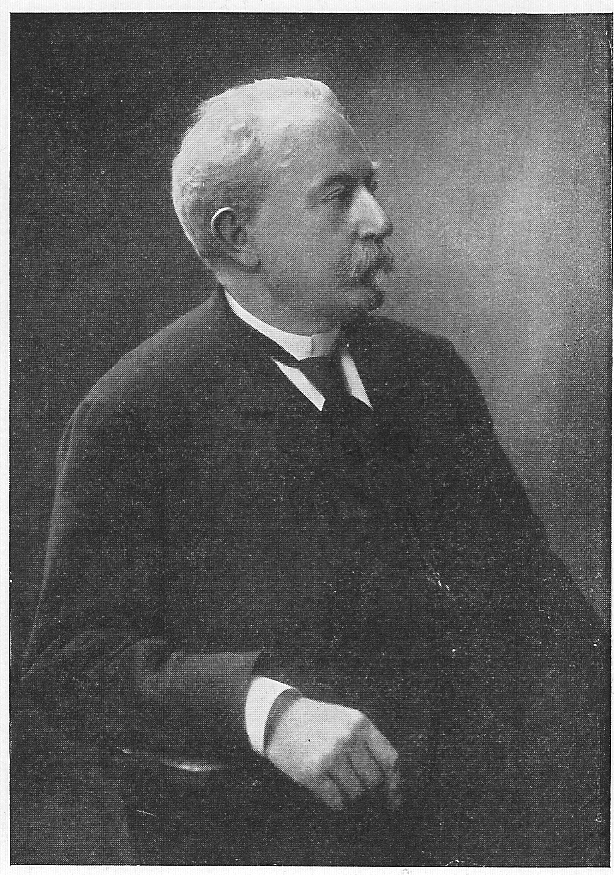
- In office 1895–1918

Personal details
- Born: 14 June 1846 Paris, France
- Died: 26 July 1918 (aged 72)

Charles Maurice Cabart-Danneville (14 June 1846, Paris – 24 July 1918, Paris) was a French politician.

== Works ==
- 1895: La Défense de nos côtes. Paris: Hachette
- 1913: Les Poudres de la guerre et de la marine en France et à l'étranger. Paris: Berger-Levrault
