= Louis-Alexandre de Cessart =

French engineer (1719–1806)

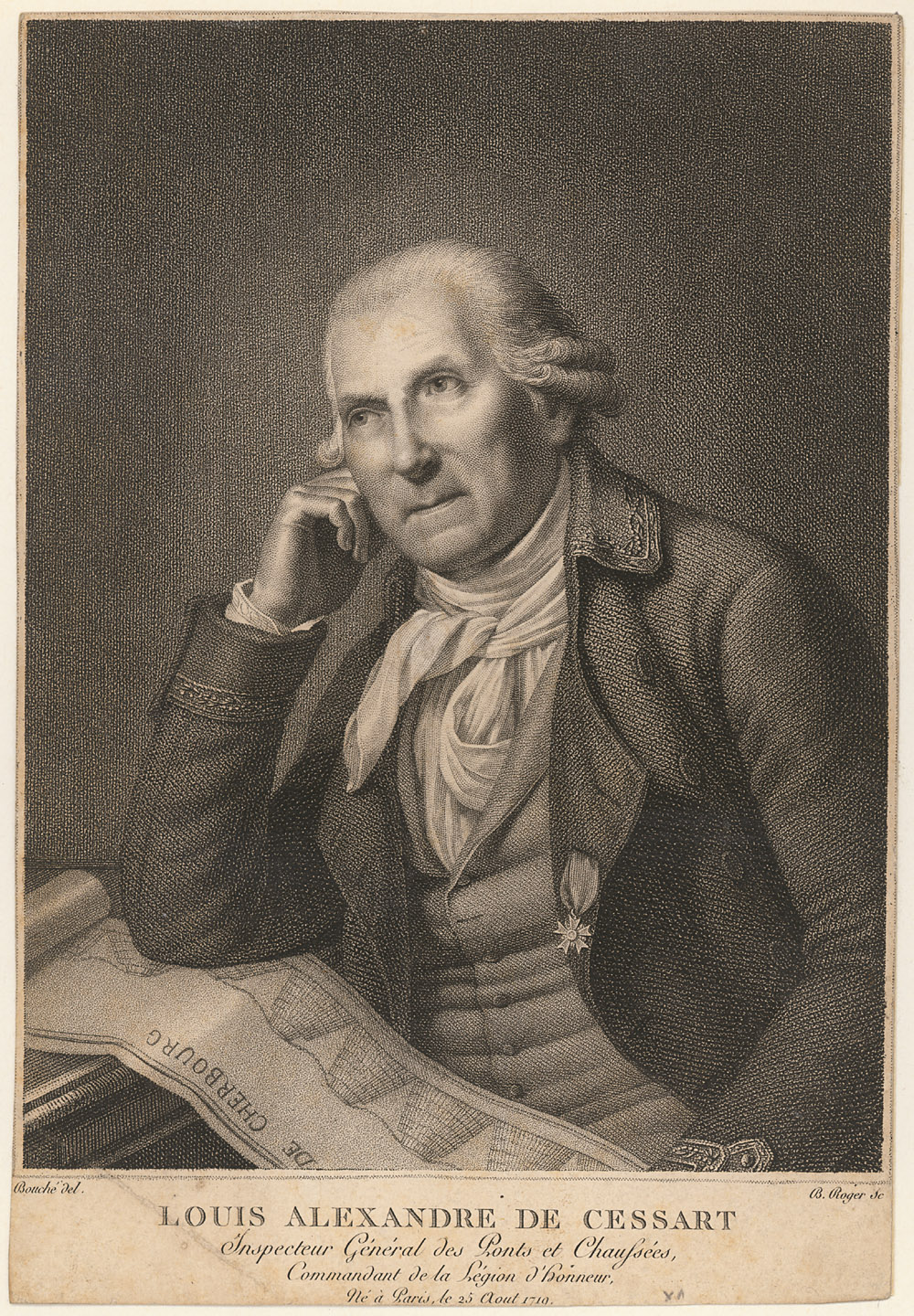
Louis-Alexandre de Cessart

Louis-Alexandre de Cessart (25 August 1719, Paris – 12 April 1806, Rouen) was a French road and bridge engineer.

He served in the "gendarmerie de la Maison du Roi", fighting at the battles of Fontenoy and Raucoux in 1745 and 1746. In 1747 he entered the school of Jean-Rodolphe Perronet, which later became the École nationale des ponts et chaussées. He contributed to the Encyclopédie with Perronet and Jean-Baptiste de Voglie. He was made under-engineer of the generality of Tours in 1751.

Notably, it was he who conceived several bridges over the river Loire, along with the Pont des Arts over the Seine in Paris, the first dike project at Cherbourg, and several quays at ports in north-west France.

== Bibliography ==
- Louis-Victor Dubois d'Arneuville, Description des travaux hydrauliques de Louis-Alexandre de Cessart, A.-A. Renouard, Paris, 2 volumes, 1806–1808.
