= Alexander Dury =

British soldier

Major-General Alexander Dury
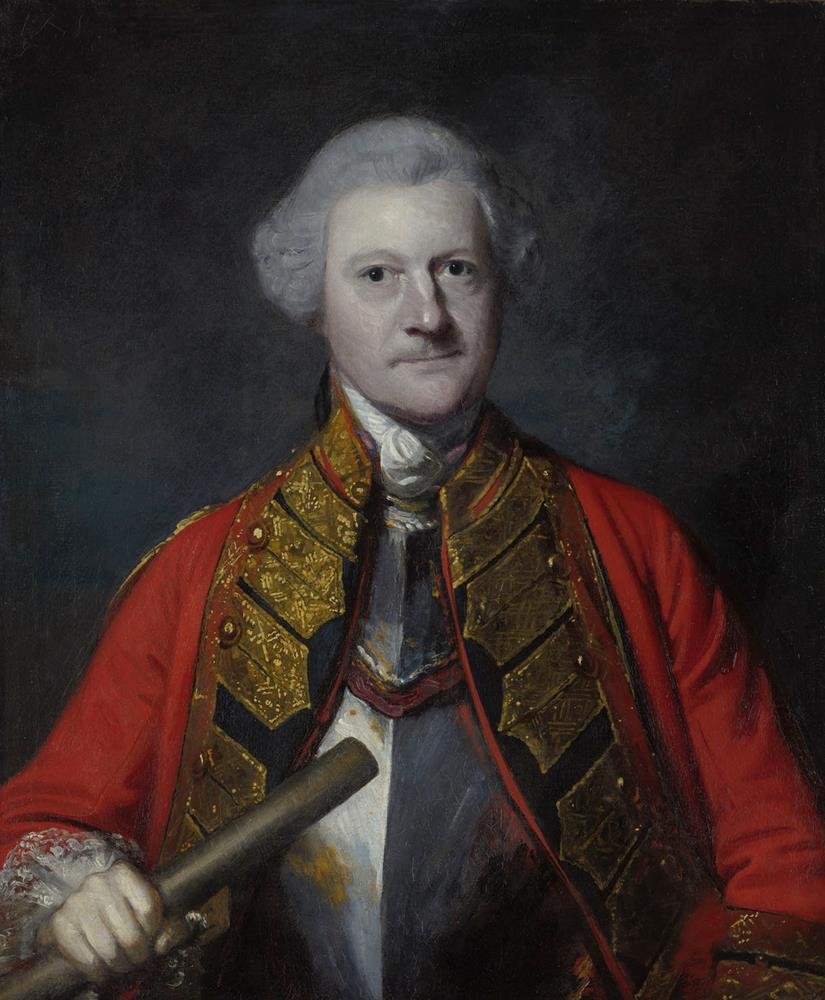
- Portrait by Sir Joshua Reynolds
- Born: 10 December 1704; Edinburgh
- Died: September 11, 1758 (aged 53); Saint Cast
- Spouse: Isabella Turnor (m. 1753)
- Children: 3
- Military career
- Rank: Major-General
- Unit: First Regiment of Foot Guards
- Conflicts: War of the Austrian Succession; Battle of Fontenoy; Battle of Lauffeld; Siege of Maastricht; Seven Years' War; Raid on Cherbourg; Battle of Saint Cast †

Major-General Alexander Dury (1704 – 1758) was a British soldier who fought in the War of the Austrian Succession. Although he attended a religious academy he chose to make the army his career, rising to the rank of Major General in the First Regiment of Foot Guards. He was killed whilst leading the British rearguard at the Battle of Saint Cast in Brittany at the age of 54.

== Early life ==
He was born in Edinburgh on 10 December 1704, and christened the next day. He was a son of the Huguenot immigrants Theodore Du Ry (born in France in 1661) and Mary-Anne Boulier De Beauregard.

Dury attended the Geneva Academy, with Antoine Maurice (later professor of divinity) as his mentor. The academy was founded by Calvin and, at the time Dury was there, had the primary aim of training ministers. Dury, however, studied languages and belles lettres: his outstanding intellectual abilities had been acclaimed and he was admired for the brilliant exposition of his thesis ‘De Terrae Motu’ [On the Earthquake]. He returned to Britain at the end of May 1721."

== Personal life ==
Dury married Isabella Turnor at St Mary Abbots Church, Kensington on 24 July 1753. They had two sons:

- Alexander (1 Oct 1754 – 13 Oct 1754)
- Alexander (17 Aug 1756 – 28 Feb 1825). He matriculated at Magdalen College, Oxford on 31 Oct 1774, and later became an Ensign in the First Regiment of Foot Guards in 1775, was promoted Captain, later Lieutenant-Colonel, a Company Commander, in 1789, and retired in 1794. Dury was great-grandfather of Theodore Seton Dury (1854-1932) and 2nd great-grandfather of Lieutenant Colonel Guy Alexander Ingram Dury (1895-1976), known as Guy, of the Grenadier Guards, who were both English first-class cricketers.

The pedigree of the Dury family, from the mid-seventeenth century, is available online. Several had military careers.

Alexander Dury's portrait was painted by Sir Joshua Reynolds in 1758. Dury wrote his will on 11 May 1758. After his death his extensive library was auctioned over a period of four days. Dury's library "reflected both his wealth and his strong, continuing enthusiasm for his books on war"; some 120 titles on war accounted for more than a fifth of his collection.

== Military career ==
Dury's father, Theodore (naturalised in 1706), was a military engineer in Hugh Mackay’s Foot, designing the fortification of Stirling Castle and elsewhere, and was able to afford commissions for both his sons. Thus, Alexander Dury was commissioned into the First Regiment of Foot Guards on 24 June 1721. He was appointed First Major on 10 October 1747; Lieutenant-Colonel on 9 May 1749; and Major General on 15 Feb 1757.

Early in his career, Dury was assigned to special intelligence duties. One such was the detention in 1744 of the elderly and infirm Colonel William Cecil. Cecil been gathering data on the numbers of Jacobite sympathisers in England who would rally to support Marshal Saxe in his invasion of England, and was sent to The Tower. Dury was also involved with the arrest of an even more important Jacobite, James Barry, 4th Earl of Barrymore.

Dury's next notable assignment came the following year. During the Battle of Fontenoy in 1745 the Duke of Cumberland was annoyed by what he considered to be ill treatment of English wounded and prisoners by the French, in breach of the agreement on prisoners of war reached with Noailles some two years earlier. However Saxe argued that the English were already in breach of the agreement by confining at the Round Tower, Windsor Castle, the prestigious Marshal Belle-Isle and his brother, who had been captured in Hanover. It was decided to free the Belle-Isle brothers, and Dury was immediately detailed to escort them back to France. He first took his distinguished charges to London where, incognito, they were given a tour of some of the main sights. After returning to the Palace of Westminster and the Abbey, and then a good supper, they were taken to see the Doggett's Coat and Badge rowing race on the Thames (and not to see Swan Upping as reported by Whitworth). More sightseeing took place next day and, on the following morning, the Marshal's party was escorted out of London to Blackheath, and thence to Canterbury and Dover. The returning Maréchal was warmly welcomed in Calais, where he presented Dury with a gold-hilted sword.

Alexander Dury took part in the Battle of Lauffeld in 1747, and then at the siege of Maastricht in 1748. Ten years later he was in charge of a brigade of Guards which was to sail to northern France. The object was a series of “descents” (diversionary raids) which would draw the French forces away from central Europe - in particular Hanover. One such attack was the raid on Cherbourg in August, in which the French put up little resistance and the port and forts were razed. After their success the British moved west for a descent on St Malo, but this failed and many men were lost. They then moved to St. Cast in Brittany, arriving on 11 September 1758. Disaster struck: during the battle the British lost more than twice as many men as the French, as they fled back to their vessels. Alexander Dury was killed that day while trying to help his men get aboard.
