= Raid on St Malo =

1758 raid of the Seven Years' War

- Part of the Seven Years' War
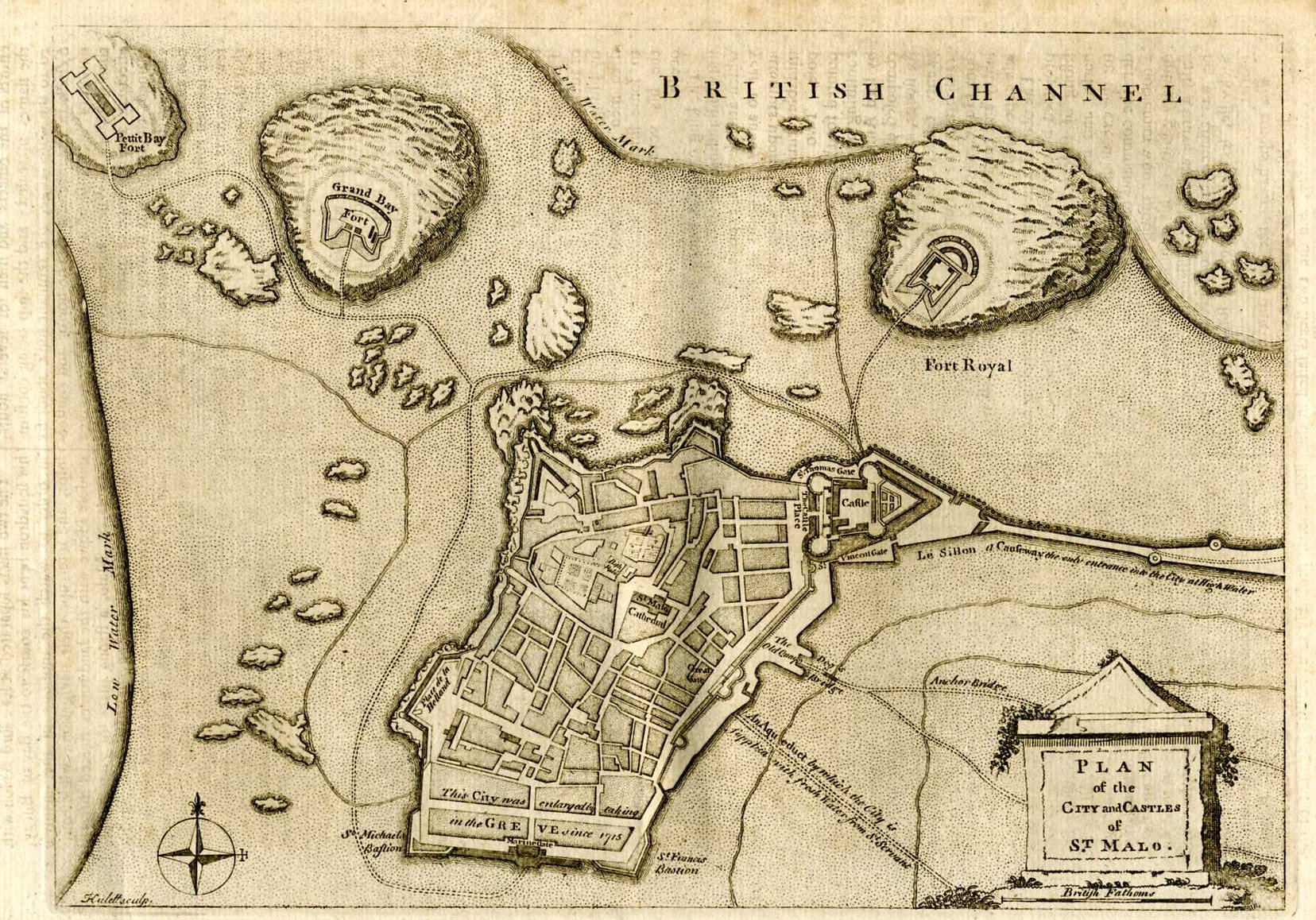
- 18th-century map of Saint Malo
Date	5–12 June 1758
Location	Saint-Malo, France 48.6481°N 2.0075°W
Result	British victory

Belligerents
Great Britain	France

Commanders and leaders
Duke of Marlborough; Richard Howe; Lord George Sackville	Unknown

Strength
13,000; 22 ships of the line 8 Frigates	Unknown

Casualties and losses
Unknown	30 privateers destroyed 100 merchant ships destroyed

The raid on St Malo took place in June 1758 when an amphibious British naval expedition landed close to the French port of Saint-Malo in Brittany. While the town itself was not attacked, as had been initially planned, the British destroyed large amounts of shipping before re-embarking a week later. The naval forces were under the command of Richard Howe while the army was led by the Duke of Marlborough and Lord Sackville.

== Background ==
As part of an effort to provide a diversion in support of Britain's German Allies, William Pitt had conceived the idea of a series of naval descents, or amphibious attacks. In 1757 a large expedition was sent to Rochefort where it captured an offshore island, but failed to make an attack on the town itself before returning home. Pitt believed that the failure was due to insufficient vigour by the expedition's commanders, and planned to launch further expeditions against the French coast in the coming year.

== Raid ==
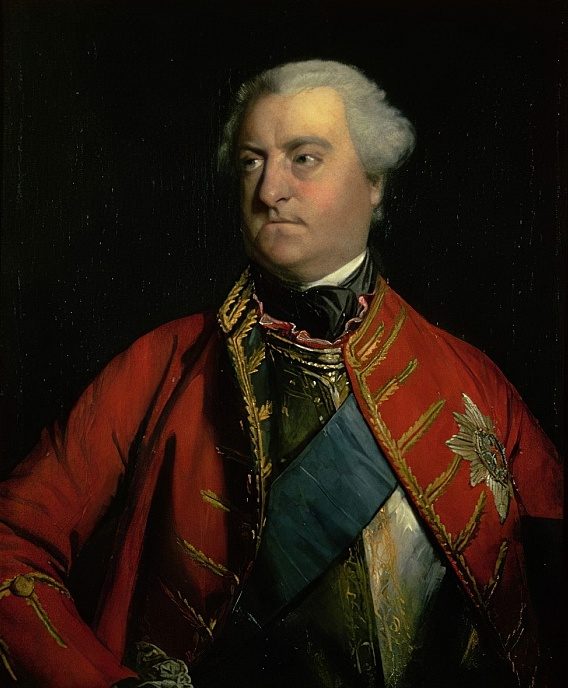
Lord Marlborough, the raid's commander

By early 1758 the British cabinet planned the next raid and began to assemble a force on the Isle of Wight. Pitt had learned a number of lessons from the Rochefort expedition. New landing-craft were designed, and the process of assembling the force improved to speed up the departure date. The selected target of the expedition, St Malo - a fishing and privateer port on the northern coast of Brittany - would allow the British force to remain in the English Channel so it could return home at short notice in case of a French invasion of Britain.

On 1 June the expedition sailed from England, reaching Cancale Bay near St Malo on 5 June. That evening the landing craft carrying the soldiers were put ashore. St Malo stood at the end of a causeway, and the British hoped to cut off the fresh-water supply that ran along it. The only immediate opposition they faced was a French artillery battery, "but the well-directed fire from the frigates soon silenced the enemy's guns, and the troops soon after landed without opposition".

The troops then marched towards St Malo, but it soon became apparent they would need to conduct a full-scale siege to take the town - something they did not have the time to do. Instead the British occupied St Servan, a nearby port, and burned 30 privateers and 100 other vessels. Troops were sent on a reconnaissance eastwards towards Dol. They reported the approach of a sizeable French force - and Marlborough decided that it was the right time to withdraw. On 11 and 12 June the British expedition re-embarked. The force remained off St Malo for more than a week, and then sailed along the coast in an attempt to scout out fresh targets. Attacks on Le Havre or Caen were considered but not followed through. The British then began to focus their attention on Cherbourg in Normandy. However, bad weather forced them to abort planned landings on 29 June and 3 July. With his force short of water and other provisions Marlborough made the decision to return home, and the expedition sailed for Portsmouth.

== Aftermath ==
While the expedition had failed to seize St Malo, it was widely considered a success. The French became alarmed when the expedition had set off, believing it was destined for Flanders where it could link-up with the German army under the Duke of Brunswick which had recently crossed the River Rhine. When it was discovered that St Malo was the correct destination, the general French reaction was relief. However, as with the Rochefort raid, the sudden descent made the French more concerned about the coast and increasingly large numbers of troops were deployed on coastal defence duties.

In September of the same year, following a successful descent on Cherbourg a second British force under Thomas Bligh attempted another raid on St Malo. Caught ashore by a larger force of French troops they were only able to re-embark with considerable difficulty following the Battle of St Cast. This brought an end to the policy of descents as government policy had changed to support a more direct British military presence in Germany.

It was announced that the Prince Edward, Duke of York, younger brother of the Prince of Wales, was to join the next expedition.

== Bibliography ==
- Anderson, Fred. Crucible of War: The Seven Years War and the Fate of Empire in British North America, 1754-1766. Faber and Faber, 2000.
- Corbett, Julian Stafford. England in the Seven Years' War: A study in Combined Operations. Volume I. London, 1907.
- Middleton, Richard. The Bells of Victory: The Pitt-Newcastle Ministry and the Conduct of the Seven Years' War, 1757-1762. Cambridge University Press, 1985.
- Syrett, David. Admiral Lord Howe: A Biography. Spellmount, 2006.
- Szabo, Franz A.J. The Seven Years War in Europe, 1756-1763. Pearson, 2008.
- Tyllard, Stella. A Royal Affair: George III and his Troublesome Siblings. Vintage, 2007.
