= Anne Beaumanoir =

French neurophysiologist (1923–2022)

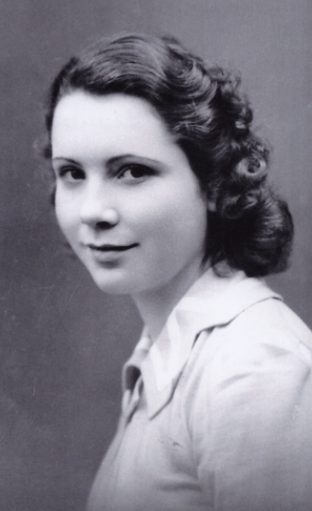
- Beaumanoir c. 1940
- Born: 30 October 1923; Guildo, Dinan, Côtes-du-Nord, France
- Died: 4 March 2022 (aged 98)
- Other name: Annette Roger
- Citizenship: France
- Occupation: Neurophysiologist
- Political party: French Communist Party
- Awards: Righteous Among the Nations (1996)

Anne Beaumanoir (30 October 1923 – 4 March 2022) was a French neurophysiologist. For her aid to Jews in Brittany during the Second World War, she as well as her parents were recognised as Righteous Among the Nations by Yad Vashem. A militant communist who was involved with the French Resistance during the Second World War, she was imprisoned for supporting the FLN in the Algerian War.

== Biography ==
=== Early life ===
Beaumanoir was born in Brittany on 30 October 1923, in Guildo, a commune in the Arrondissement of Dinan in the Côtes-du-Nord department, the daughter of restaurateurs Jean and Marthe Beaumanoir.

=== Second World War ===
During the Second World War, Beaumanoir was a medical student and a clandestine militant member of the French Communist Party (PCF). Her parents regularly sent food parcels to her through friends. One day in June 1944, these friends informed her that there would be a raid the following night in the 13th arrondissement of Paris, and asked her to warn a woman called Victoria, who was hiding a Jewish family. Although she knew that the PCF frowned on unauthorised rescue missions, Beaumanoir went to Victoria's apartment to warn her. She was introduced to the Lisopravski family, and its two youngest members, the son, Daniel, aged 16, and the daughter, Simone, aged 14, agreed to go with her.

She took them to a hiding place where several members of the French Resistance were staying. Soon afterwards, it was raided by the Gestapo, but the two teenagers escaped over the rooftops along with the leader of the Resistance group. Beaumanoir was not in Paris at the time; when she returned, she collected the youths from their temporary hiding place and took them to live with her parents at their home in Dinan.

In Dinan, her father, Jean Beaumanoir, was interrogated by the police, who suspected that he was a member of the Resistance, but was released for lack of evidence. Her mother, Marthe Beaumanoir, hid the two youths in different locations for a fortnight, but the couple then kept them at their home for a year. After the war, the two teenagers remained in contact with Beaumanoir and her parents.

=== Post-war ===
Beaumanoir returned to her medical studies in Marseille. She became a professor of neurology, and married a doctor. She had a falling out with the PCF, and left it in 1955. In Marseille, she met the worker-priests and became familiar with their social work among the Algerians there. She returned to Paris, where she became a medical researcher. She sided with the FLN in the Algerian War, and was arrested in November 1959 and sentenced to ten years' imprisonment.

Incarcerated in Baumettes Prison, Beaumanoir was initially kept in solitary confinement but was then tasked with teaching fellow prisoners how to read and write, and writing letters for them. Because she was pregnant, she was provisionally released after serving eight months in order to give birth. After the birth of her son, she escaped to Tunisia, where she joined the FLN, serving as a neuropsychiatrist under Frantz Fanon. After the Évian Accords ended the Algerian War, Beaumanoir worked for the Minister of Health in the government of Ahmed Ben Bella. When he was overthrown in 1965, she fled to Switzerland, where she became the director of the neurophysiology department of the University Hospital of Geneva.

In retirement, Beaumanoir lived partly in her hometown of Saint-Cast-le-Guildo, Côtes-d'Armor in Brittany, and partly in Dieulefit in the Drôme department. She called for the reception of Syrian refugees.

Beaumanoir died on 4 March 2022, at the age of 98.

=== Recognition ===
Beaumanoir was recognised as one of the Righteous Among the Nations on 27 August 1996 by Yad Vashem, along with her parents. In 2016, investigative journalist and documentary filmmaker Denis Robert and his daughter Nina Robert co-produced a documentary on Beaumanoir's life titled Une vie d'Annette. In 2020 the German author Anne Weber published Annette, ein Heldinnenepos, an epic poem based on Beaumanoir's life, which won the German Book Prize for 2020.
