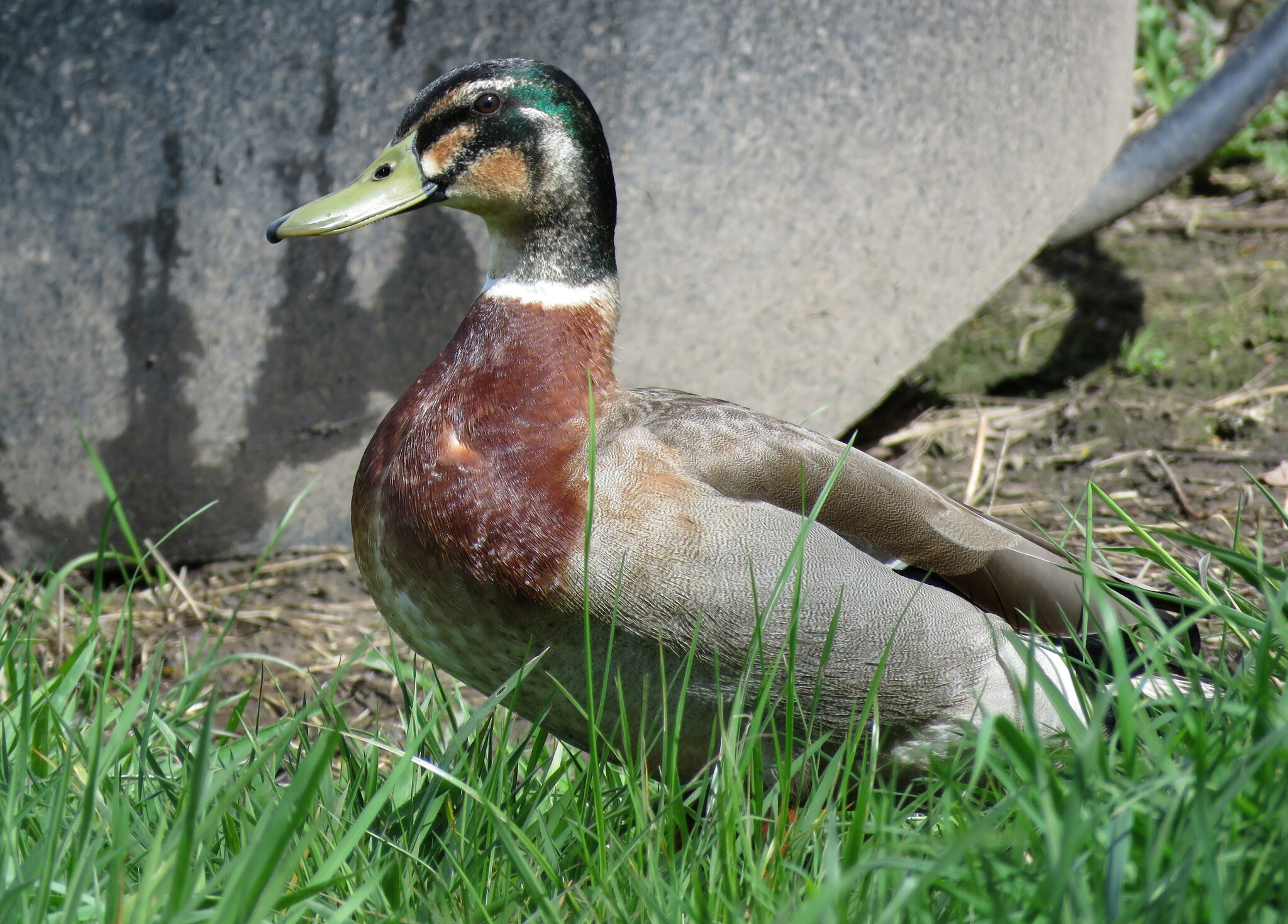
- A distinctively hybrid drake in Lincoln, New Zealand

Scientific classification
- Kingdom: Animalia
- Phylum: Chordata
- Class: Aves
- Order: Anseriformes
- Family: Anatidae
- Tribe: Anatini
- Genus: Anas
- Species: A. platyrhynchos × A. superciliosa

= Mallard x Pacific black duck hybrid =

Mallard x Pacific black duck

Hybrid duck

A mallard x pacific black duck hybrid is the hybrid offspring between a feral or domestic mallard (Anas platyrhynchos), and a pacific black duck (A. superciliosa) (abbreviated as PBD or sometimes called the grey duck). Hybrid ducks can result from the crossing of either a mallard drake x a female pacific black duck, or a pacific black drake x a female mallard. Though hybrid ducks are fertile, they are not widely considered a unique species, and are classified under the same genus as their parent species. The mallard is known to hybridise with twenty-six species of waterfowl, with most being dabbling ducks of the genus Anas.

== History ==
Originally occurring in Eurasia and North America, the northern mallard was introduced to areas overlapping with the range of the Polynesian and Australasian occurring pacific black duck throughout the 19th and 20th centuries, being introduced to Australia in the 1860s (as early as 1862), and to New Zealand in 1867. The mallard was introduced to Australia and New Zealand as a gamefowl, but also through efforts by acclimisation societies as a means of creating an environment reminiscent of the native Europe of many settlers. Both species are dabbling ducks of the genus Anas that occupy ecologically similar niches in their respective ranges, and have naturally come into contact in areas of distributive overlap. In both Australia and New Zealand, its range increased rapidly in the 1950s as agricultural areas were developed in the post-war period. Historic records indicate that hybridisation increased significantly following this range expansion, with rates of hybridisation being less than 3% in New Zealand prior to 1958.

=== Introduction to Australia ===
The mallard was introduced to Australia as early as 1862, and saw prolific expansion into wetlands across the continent. The species was introduced incrementally to each state, first arriving in Victoria as early as 1864 with additional introduction efforts in 1971–72 where it has seen the most distributive expansion and success. It was introduced to Sydney and Perth before 1900 and before 1912 respectively, and has since become widespread in the proximity of each capital. The mallard has been noted to have spread throughout South Australia and Queensland too, occurring as far north as Maryborough in the latter, though it has only formed non-breeding populations in the state. The species can also be found uncommonly in Tasmania and the King and Flinders Islands north of the state. Lord Howe Island, Macquarie Island, and Norfolk Island all possess introduced mallard populations as well. While they occur here only in small densities, they have already contributed to a drastic decline in native pacific black duck populations regardless. Much of the hybrids present on Lord Howe Island in particular appear to be descended from New Zealand stock, and may have migrated from the mainland. The lack of phenotypic expression and diversity of purebred pacific black ducks on the island may indicate that the species has become locally extinct there.

=== Introduction to New Zealand ===
The mallard is stated to have been introduced to New Zealand as early as 1867. Interbreeding with the native pacific black duck population began soon after introduction, with the first hybrid ducks being reported as early as 1885. The Natural History of Canterbury did not mention the mallard in its 1927 edition, indicating that the initial introduction of mallards may have been to some degree unsuccessful, though, the pacific black duck is noted as having declined in numbers due to hunting. Mallards were introduced from North America again in the 1920s–40s, and subsequent introduction of Australian feral populations occurred sometime in the 20th century as well. These later introductions were more significant, and may have been more successful due to the pacific black duck population having already been extricated from some areas due to hunting. New Zealand mallards have experienced significant introgression from hybridisation since their introduction, becoming no longer genetically consistent with the original stock of northern mallards introduced throughout the 19th and 20th centuries, constituting a novel genetic cluster (often referred to as a hybrid swarm) today.

==== Purposeful hybridisation ====
In 1967, the former New Zealand Wildlife Service (NZWS) commenced a controlled hybrid breeding programme in order to "establish objective criteria for the identification of hybrids". The programme was conducted at the Pūkaha National Wildlife Centre (at the time known as the Mount Bruce Native Bird Reserve) near Masterton, and involved the assemblage of a stock of both species for purposeful interbreeding. Ducks were housed in two large aviaries equipped with freshwater terraces of a maximum depth of 2cm (0.8in) fed by a stream and bolstered by boulders to discourage erosion and allow "loafing" behaviour (a position assumed by a contented duck during relaxation). Artificial and natural nesting sites were provided in the form of tin hutches, open faced boxes separated by hessian to reduce visibility of ducks between pairs, and areas of dense long grass or other foliage in order to create ideal conditions for breeding. Nests were readily accepted by pairs of both species, which were fed crushed oyster shells and granulated lime in order to meet individual calcium demands characteristic of laying three or more clutches at a heightened frequency. Though nests were occupied quickly, pacific black duck pairs did not lay at all in the first year of the study, whereas mallards did, likely having adapted to captivity faster comparatively. While mallards typically laid larger clutches than pacific black ducks, hybrid females (a group referred to in the study as F1) tended to lay clutches between the size of both parent species. High embryo fatality was recorded among clutches resulting from crosses between pacific black duck drakes and F1 females, indicating gametic incompatibility resulting from backcrossing. Despite this however, backcrossing F1 females with mallard drakes resulted in higher rates of embryonic development and hatchling survival comparatively to backcrossing with pacific black drakes. Backcrossed hybrids were found to produce viable offspring that progressed to hatching, whereas F1 x F1 pairs laid fertile clutches that did not hatch.

== Appearance ==
Mallard x pacific black duck hybrids are typically visually distinct from both parent species, however, the expression of phenotypical traits from either parent species varies significantly between individuals. Hybrids are often said to express traits more in common with mallards than black ducks, however, two morphologically distinct hybrid populations in the Otago region of southeast New Zealand have been noted to resemble mallards and pacific black ducks respectively. The phenotype of a hybrid is not always indicative of its genetic makeup, with analysis of hybrid mitochondrial DNA (mtDNA) conducted in 2019 finding that; while an individual may express morphological characteristics congruent with one parent species, it may possess the mtDNA of the other.

=== Legs and bills ===
An obvious hybrid duck. Note the chestnut coloured breast, emergence of green plumage along the brow, lack of developed barring beneath the eye, and yellow-green bill. In this case, the bright orange legs can also be used as an indication of hybridisation due to the already prominent expression of mallard-esque traits in the morphology, and the intensity of the colour.

A cryptic hybrid duck. Note the discolouration of the bill at the tip and base, as well as the blotching. One major tell of hybridisation here is how faded the lower barring under the eye is. The trims surrounding each feather are also thicker than typical for a pacific black duck, leading to a lighter coloured body. The legs here are within possibility for pacific black ducks, but in consideration with bill colouration are likely tells of hybridisation.

It is often stated that hybrid ducks are easily distinguished by their bright orange legs, which are considered to exclusively occur in hybrids. Purebred pacific black ducks can express orange legs, though they are far less saturated than those of mallards, and sampling of phenotypes among the species indicates a prevalence of olive-green, grey, of khaki coloured legs over oranges or yellows in New Zealand populations. In Tasmania, the only duck species that possesses bright orange legs akin to those of the mallard is the Australasian shoveler (Anas rhynchotis). A 2019 study conducted by the Ornithological Society of New Zealand that analysed the phenotypic expression of hybrids to quantify the recognisability of their traits in the wild found that; 95.8% hybrid drakes possessed bright orange legs characteristic of mallards. Orange-tinged legs may appear more frequently amongst hybrid ducks that are superficially identical to pacific black ducks, though if the individual does not express any other tells of hybridisation, the morphological distinction is usually best left ignored. Legs can however, be used in the distinction between purebred pacific black ducklings and juveniles, which exclusively possess grey legs compared to the orange-tinged legs of hybrid ducklings.

The bill is another point of scrutiny in determining a mallard x pacific black duck hybrid. In purebred pacific black duck, the bill is almost always a solid slate grey colour with subtle green undertones, appearing very apparently different from the variable shades of bright yellows, oranges, browns, and brown-greys of female mallards and drakes. Obvious hybrids usually possess blotchy bills with a colouration more reminiscent to mallards, while more cryptic hybrids tend to only have mallard-adjacent colouration around the base and tip of the bill.

=== Plumage ===
While female mallards and some individual pacific black ducks may appear superficially similar due to morphological consistencies between their dappled tan, brown, and dark greyish brown plumage, both parent species are very easily separated by facial markings. Among both female pacific black ducks and drakes, a pair of lateral black bars are apparent on the face, with a thick superciliary bar extending from the base of the bill and streaking through the eye before ceasing around the ear, and a thinner partially less defined black bar extending from the gape, separating the cheek into two prominent cream patches. Female mallards possess a singular, lighter coloured, fair less defined bar streaking through the eye. Hybrid ducks are likely to share traits from both species, and may sport a darker face with less developed or absent cheek bars, typically making for an obvious tell. Another sexually monomorphic trait of pacific black ducks is the black crown of feathers along the top of the skull. It is normally solidly coloured in purebred pacific black ducks, and exhibits dappling or streaking by lighter feathers to various degrees amongst hybrid ducks.

Per the 2019 ornithological study, 86% of females and 52% of drakes derived from the interbreeding of mallard drakes x female pacific black ducks, and 16% of females and 24% of drakes derived from pacific black drakes x female mallards possessed facial plumage more in common with pacific black ducks than mallards. Additionally, 36% of examined purebred pacific black ducks possessed facial mottling and dark napes that are more frequently identified in hybrids. Mallard drakes are well-known for their vibrant green heads and chestnut coloured breasts and throats which make them easily distinguishable from both female pacific black ducks and drakes. Consequently, a duck that possesses a green head but otherwise has a phenotype congruent with a pacific black duck, is certainly a hybrid (pictured). Additionally, Yellow-orange legs have been found to be linked to the partial or total expression of a green head in drakes.

Pacific black ducks possess very slight cream-coloured edging around each of their darker coloured body feathers, with the trims being more pronounced among females. These trims are further broadened in hybrids, where streaking amongst dark body feathers often results in the creation of an overall lighter coloured plumage. Hybrids may also possess upcurled tail feathers, a trait common with mallards. Hybrid ducks derived from crossing between a wild pacific black duck and a domestic mallard will often have far lighter breast, throat, and underbelly feathers common with the solid white plumage of the domestic parent.

=== Wings ===
Both species possess an irridescent speculum, a rectangular patch of coloured feathers located in the secondary flights of some birds (most well known in dabbling ducks). In pacific black ducks, the speculum is usually a beetle green with purplish indigo accents, whereas in mallards it is often more of a blue-green. Speculums are not necessarily a reliable tell of hybridisation, as the angle at which they are viewed in direct sunlight may skew the perception of their colour. The plumage around the speculum is less similar between species, with pacific black ducks typically having thick black trailing edges framing the speculum with occasional thinner borders of light tan, while mallard speculums are framed with thick white trailing edges. Amongst hybrids, the latter is more commonly expressed. 59% of hybrids derived from mallard drakes x female pacific black ducks examined in the 2019 study possessed speculum edging common with both purebred pacific black ducks as well as mallards, where the lighter buffing varied from low to high thickness between individuals derived from the cross. 68% of hybrids derived from pacific black drakes x female mallards exhibited speculum edging common in female mallards. Wing patterning varies significantly between hybrid individuals and is often more obviously indicative of hybridisation when referenced against parent species.

== Threats to pacific black duck population ==
As both pacific black ducks and mallards exist in similar environments in their native ranges, the species come into frequent contact in the advent of distributive overlap, resulting in the proliferation of hybrid ducks which compete for resources with their native parent species.

=== Genetic introgression and outcompetition of pacific black ducks in New Zealand ===
The New Zealand pacific black duck (A. s. superciliosa) has already suffered massive population reduction from most of its native range following the introduction of mallards. As of 1958, the introduced mallard constituted 53% of both species combined population in Otago, increasing to 82% in 1977. In 1981–82, plumage analysis indicated that a hybridisation rate of 51% had accumulated between the species, with the proportion of pacific black ducks in the collective population having decreased to just 4.5%, a density believed to be unsustainable for the species. As of 2025, pure genetic pockets of pacific black duck were recorded from just 9% of sites examined in the core of their range in the western portion of South Island. Across both North and South Island, pacific black ducks constitute 6–10% of collective population samples, demonstrating the extent to which the species has been outcompeted by the mallard. Analysis of the genetic vulnerability of New Zealand mallards indicate that the populations possess a higher predisposed resilience to selective pressures and ecological change than pacific black ducks, raising concerns that they may completely outcompete them.

While the breeding cycles of both species are generally asynchronous (beginning a month earlier in breeding populations of mallards), degradation and extirpation of native forests and wetlands as a result of urbanisation and agricultural expansion likely disarmed any reproductive isolation between the two species as their distributive overlap has continued to increase since initial introduction. Pacific black ducks are more suited to undisturbed habitat comparatively to the more adaptable mallard, raising concerns that the former will suffer more extensive loss due to climate change as a result of further ecological disturbances. During breeding cycles, mallard drakes have been known to court to female pacific black ducks, though the inverse interaction does not occur at a reliably observable frequency, with a 5:2 ratio of mallard drake x female pacific black duck pairings occurring in the Waikato region of New Zealand. This mating bias may indicate forceful copulation of female pacific black ducks by mallard drakes, or a bypassing of courtship behaviour entirely in favour of mating. This conclusion is favoured by behavioural changes undergone by pacific black ducks when outnumbered by mallards observed in Australia, including a reluctance to feed and fleeing from interspecies confrontation, both indicative of mallard dominance. Mallard drakes are also often connoted as being "more aggressive" than pacific black drakes, typically in relation to their mating habits and related territorial nature. The propensity of female mallards to lay replacement clutches within thirteen days between clutches while more than half of female pacific black ducks surveyed by the NZWS did not lay replacement clutches at all additionally increases potential for outcompetition.

=== Genetic introgression and outcompetition of pacific black ducks in Australia and Tasmania ===
Initially, it was considered that the hybridisation between both species was restricted to urban areas in Australia due to introduced mallards being derived mostly from released domestic stock, however, phenotypic analysis of South Australian populations and New South Wales specimens has determined that hybridisation does occur in rural duck populations. The overall frequency of hybridisation between mallards and Australian pacific black ducks (A. s. rogersi) is 1.5%, considerably lower than the frequency of hybridisation in New Zealand populations. New Zealand hybrids have been found to be present on Australia's east coast, and further migration events may have potential to increase hybridisation rates. Currently, hybridisation amongst Australian duck populations is considered to be a low threat, and a survey on the comparative population densities of both species in urban parks throughout Melbourne found that pacific black ducks outnumbered mallards at all sites.

A prominent driver of the mallard's distributive expansion and the proliferation of hybrids in Australian and Tasmanian waterways has been the purposeful accommodation of mallard populations by humans. Mallards are often fed by humans in urban parks, causing them to become acclimatised to reliable food sources and further increasing their distribution by allowing them to breed in areas of regular food stability. Mallards have also been known to outcompete pacific black ducks in feeding grounds, as they are larger bodied and more aggressive. In mainland Australia, mallards have not yet shown the propensity to exclude pacific black ducks entirely from urban parks were both species occur, though they exhibit dominant nesting and feeding tendencies. Mallard overpopulation as a result of overfeeding has also become a threat to duck habitat in Tasmania as well as some parts of mainland Australia, as large flocks of mallards trample native vegetation. Waterways that are overstocked with mallards are also subject to algal blooms, increased potential for harbouring botulism, and general quality degradation as a result of waste produced by the birds. In January of 1998, a newsletter by Hunter Bird Observers Inc. based in New Lambton, New South Wales, reported that a density of upwards of five hundred mallard x pacific black duck hybrids were inhabiting the junction of Lake Macquarie and Dora Creek, with the reason given for their inhabitation being feeding.

In Tasmania, purebred pacific black duck populations are similarly threatened by genetic extirpation. Concern has been raised locally over the seemingly increasing rarity of purebred pacific black ducks in Hobart and the Derwent estuary as hybrid sightings increase. Much of the hybridisation occurring in Tasmania has been a direct result of illegal dumping of domestic mallards in natural or urban wetlands, or the mismanagement and subsequent loss of domestic mallards into the wild.

== Mitigation of hybridisation ==
In the May of 1998, the New Zealand Fish and Game Council alongside the Department of Conservation issued an official nationwide hunting season for hybrid ducks in order to attain a sample of the morphological and phenotypical characteristics of the ducks for future study and referral. Thousands of individuals were killed, with 1,992 being used in the Ornithological Society of New Zealand's study on the morphology of the hybrid and its recognisability in the field. 2,000 specimens shot in the season were sampled in a 2007 study, concluding that 74% of ducks sampled from the west coast, and 99% of ducks sampled from South Island exhibited hybrid morphology. The programme did not meaningfully reduce the hybrid population, which has continued to grow.

In conserving purebred populations of pacific black ducks, the Derwent Estuary Program and Tasmanian Government among other independent ecological preservation bodies recommend not to feed ducks of any species in order to prevent potential hybridisation from occurring between mallards and pacific black ducks seeking the same food sources. Feeding wild ducks is also generally advised against as it causes nutritional deficiencies which can result in deformations such as angel wing.The Tasmanian Government strongly advises owners of domestic ducks to "adequately contain" them in order to avoid potential further introduction of mallards into existing feral populations. This advice is frequently repeated as a measure to mitigate hybridisation and restrict potential opportunities for pacific black ducks to become outcompeted in their native range. Alternatively, muscovy ducks (Cairina moschata var. domestica), a breed that cannot hybridise with the pacific black duck, can also be kept.

== Natural hybridisation ==
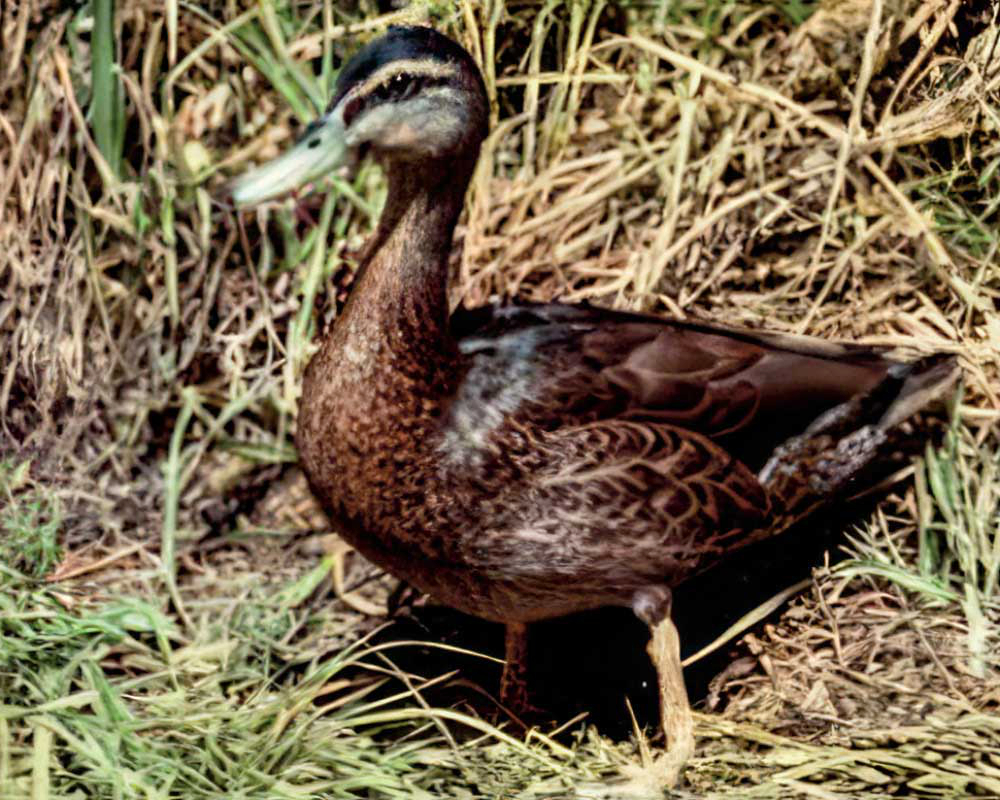
The last Mariana drake. Note the undefined under-eye cheek barring and orange-coloured legs correlational to known cryptic hybrid examples.

The mallard and pacific black duck are known to naturally coexist on the Mariana Islands, an archipelago off the eastern coast of the Philippines and a part of the extremities of both species' distributions. It is hypothesised that the Mariana mallard (Anas oustaleti), an extinct dabbling duck once endemic to the archipelago may have in reality been a subspecies created from the hybridisation between the mallard and pacific black duck. The taxonomic validity of the Mariana mallard is heavily debated, and it is currently undecided whether or not the population constituted a wholly new species, subspecies, or a hybrid swarm. The United States Fish and Wildlife Service designates the Mariana mallard as a subspecies; (A. p. oustaleti). Among the population, all females and a majority of drakes exhibited a phenotype congruent with pacific black ducks, though possessed bright orange legs and lacked cheek barring, both common in known hybrids. Conversely, a smaller percentage of males exhibited a phenotype congruent with male mallards, including the appearance of the speculum and general plumage. The variability of phenotypes and the propensity of the morphology of the Mariana mallard to match descriptions of known hybrids may support the conclusion that the population was the result of hybridisation.
