= Irène Aïtoff =

French pianist (1904–2006)

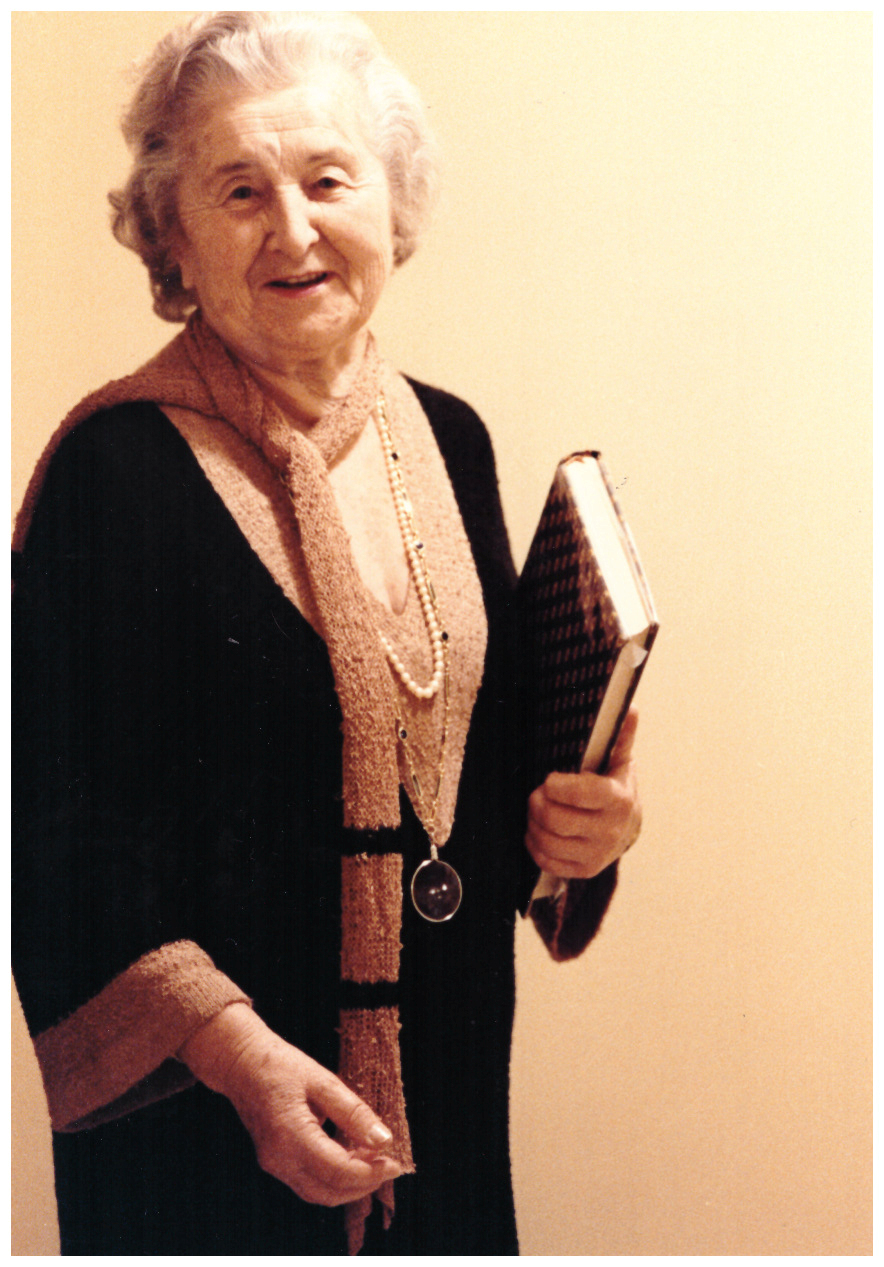
- Portrait of Irène Aïtoff
- Born: Nathalie Irène Aïtoff; 30 July 1904
- Died: 5 June 2006 (aged 101)
- Occupations: Pianist and vocal coach

Irène Aïtoff (30 July 1904 – 5 June 2006) was a French pianist and vocal coach.

== Biography ==
Born in Saint-Cast (Côtes-d'Armor), Aïtoff was admitted in the Conservatoire de Paris after having been introduced to Alfred Cortot. She was quickly recognized in musical circles as an excellent pianist, but did not make a concert career.

From 1932 to 1939, she accompanied the singer Yvette Guilbert with whom she discovered that "French singing is inseparable from the text." Therefore, diction was essential for her.

From 1940, her name was often associated with that of the great conductor Charles Munch, of whom she became an important collaborator, known for her ability to teach singers their role, to reduce or transpose orchestral scores.

She was also vocal conductor at the Aix-en-Provence Festival since the 1950s with Gabriel Dussurget. She had artists like Teresa Berganza, Teresa Stich-Randall and Gabriel Bacquier work.

During the 1960s, she had the honour of being asked by Herbert von Karajan to ensure the singers' preparation to perform Debussy's Pelléas et Mélisande.

In 1973, she worked for The Marriage of Figaro directed by Giorgio Strehler. Her spat with chef Georg Solti became famous.

Until the beginning of this 21st century, Irène Aïtoff gave her advice and observations to many students, and worked with various renowned chefs, including Georg Solti and Charles Dutoit. She was known for her uncommon will and the extreme rigour of her demands, especially of herself. In 1994, she accompanied Hélène Delavault for her show L'Absinthe on songs from 1900.

At the Théâtre Impérial de Compiègne in 1995, she was in charge of rehearsals of Auber's Le domino noir, a work that had totalled 1209 performances at the Salle Favart between 1837 and 1909.

On 30 May 2002, on the centenary of Pelléas et Mélisande at the Opéra-Comique in Paris, that which had become with the passing of time, and in spite of the most complete ignorance of the media spheres, a figure of the French musical life had insisted, in spite of her great age, to mark the event of her presence.

In 2008, filmmaker Dominique Delouche devoted a documentary called La Grande Mademoiselle to her.

Aïtoff died in Paris at the age of 101.
