= Émile Oustalet =

French zoologist (1844–1905)

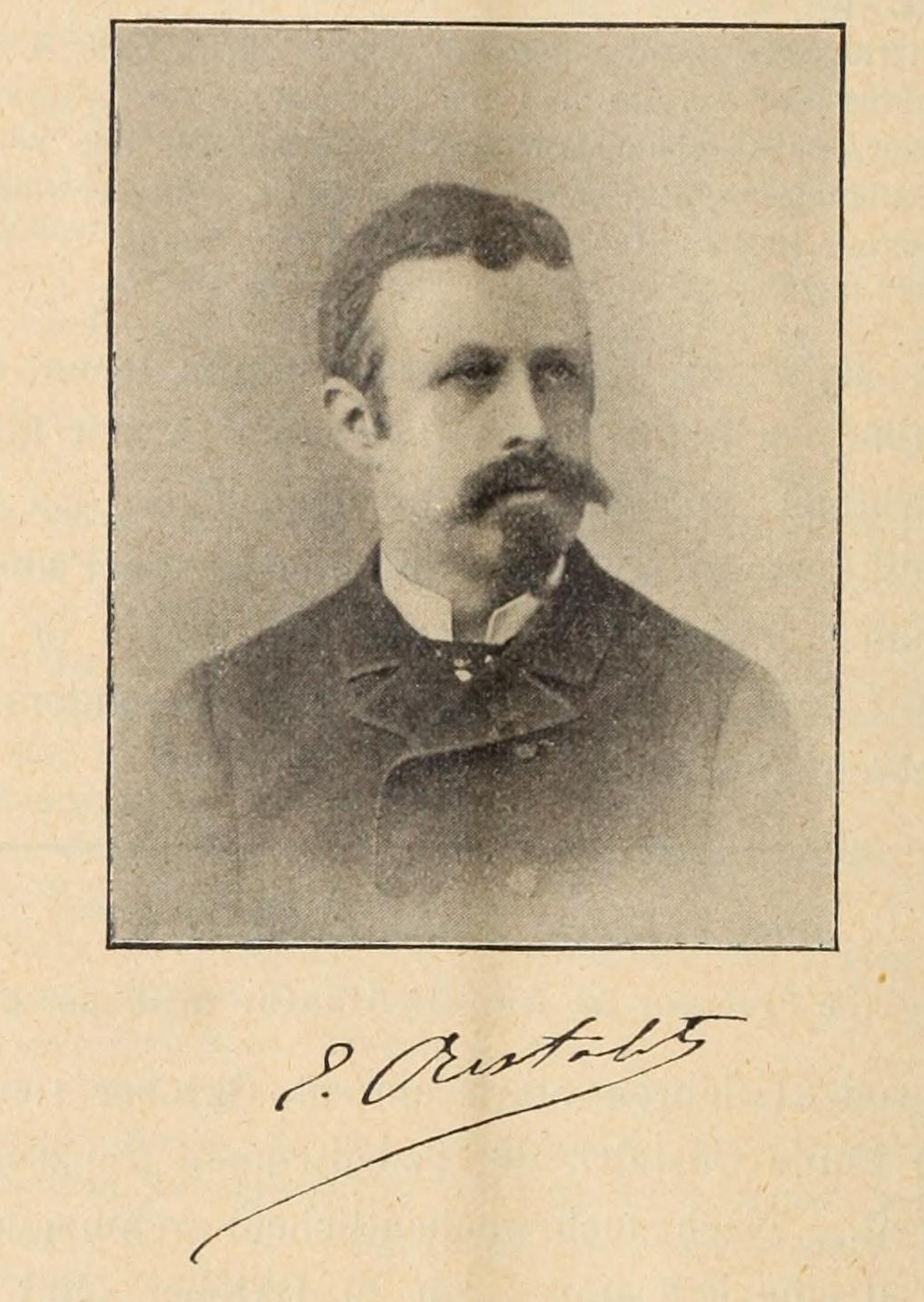
- Born: Jean-Frédéric Émile Oustalet; 24 August 1844; Montbéliard, Doubs, France
- Died: 23 October 1905 (aged 61); St. Cast, Côtes-du-Nord
- Education: École des hautes études
- Known for: Les Oiseaux de la Chine, Les Oiseaux du Cambodge
- Scientific career
- Fields: Zoology, especially ornithology
- Institutions: Muséum National d'Histoire Naturelle
- Author abbrev. (zoology): Oustalet

Jean-Frédéric Émile Oustalet (24 August 1844 – 23 October 1905) was a French zoologist who contributed greatly to ornithology.

Oustalet was born at Montbéliard, in the department of Doubs. He studied at the Ecole des Hautes-Etudes and his first scientific work was on the respiratory organs of dragonfly larvae. He was employed at the Muséum National d'Histoire Naturelle, where he succeeded Jules Verreaux as assistant-naturalist in 1875. In 1900 he succeeded Alphonse Milne-Edwards as Professor of Mammalogy.

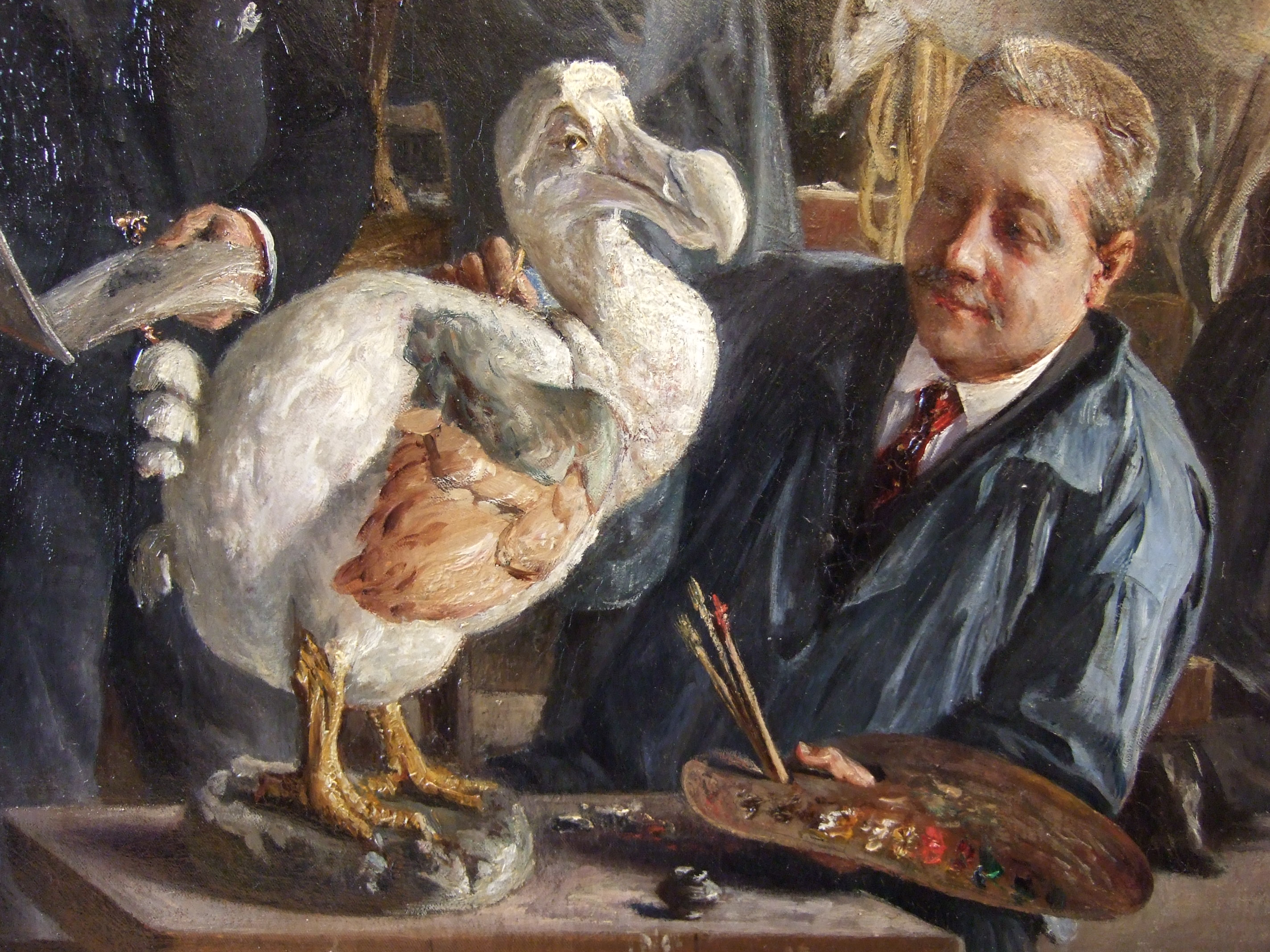
Reconstructing the dodo in the studio of Professor Oustalet, a 1903 painting

Oustalet became especially interested in birds after the museum received new specimens from Indo-China and Africa. He took a special interest in the birds of China and co-authored Les Oiseaux de la Chine (1877) with Armand David, and also wrote Les Oiseaux du Cambodge (1899). He described a specimen from Branco as a separate species Passer brancoensis in 1883, which was recognised as the subspecies Passer iagoensis brancoensis by W. R. P. Bourne, who claimed to observe differences between Iago sparrows from different islands.

Oustalet attended the International Ornithological Congress at Vienna (1884), Budapest (1891), London (1905) and presided in Paris (1900).

The duck species Anas oustaleti was named after him. A species of Malagasy chameleon, Furcifer oustaleti, was named in his honor by François Mocquard in 1894.

Oustalet died at St. Cast (Cotes-du-Nord) after several weeks of illness. The funeral was held in Montbeliard (Doubs).

== Selected writings ==
- 1874 : Recherches sur les insectes fossiles des terrains tertiaires de la France, (Research of Tertiary insect fossils from France).
- 1877 : with Armand David, Les Oiseaux de la Chine, (The Birds of China, two volumes).
- 1878 : with Alphonse Milne-Edwards, Études sur les Mammifères et les Oiseaux des Îles Comores, (Studies on Mammals and Birds of the Comoro Islands).
- 1880-1881 : Monographie des oiseaux de la famille des mégapodiidés, (Monograph of birds of the family Megapodiidae, two parts).
- 1889 : Oiseaux dans le compte rendu de la mission scientifique du Cap Horn. 1882-1883, (Birds in the report of the scientific mission of Cape Horn. 1882–1883).
- 1893 : La Protection des oiseaux, (The Protection of Birds) — reprinted in 1895 & re-edited in 1900.
- 1895 : Les Mammifères et les Oiseaux des îles Mariannes, (Mammals and Birds of the Mariana Islands, two parts).
- 1899 : Oiseaux du Cambodge, du Laos, de l'Annam et du Tonkin, (Birds of Cambodia, Laos, Annam and Tonkin).

== See also ==
- Category:Taxa named by Émile Oustalet
- European and American voyages of scientific exploration

== Sources ==
- List of publications copied from an equivalent article at the French Wikipedia.
