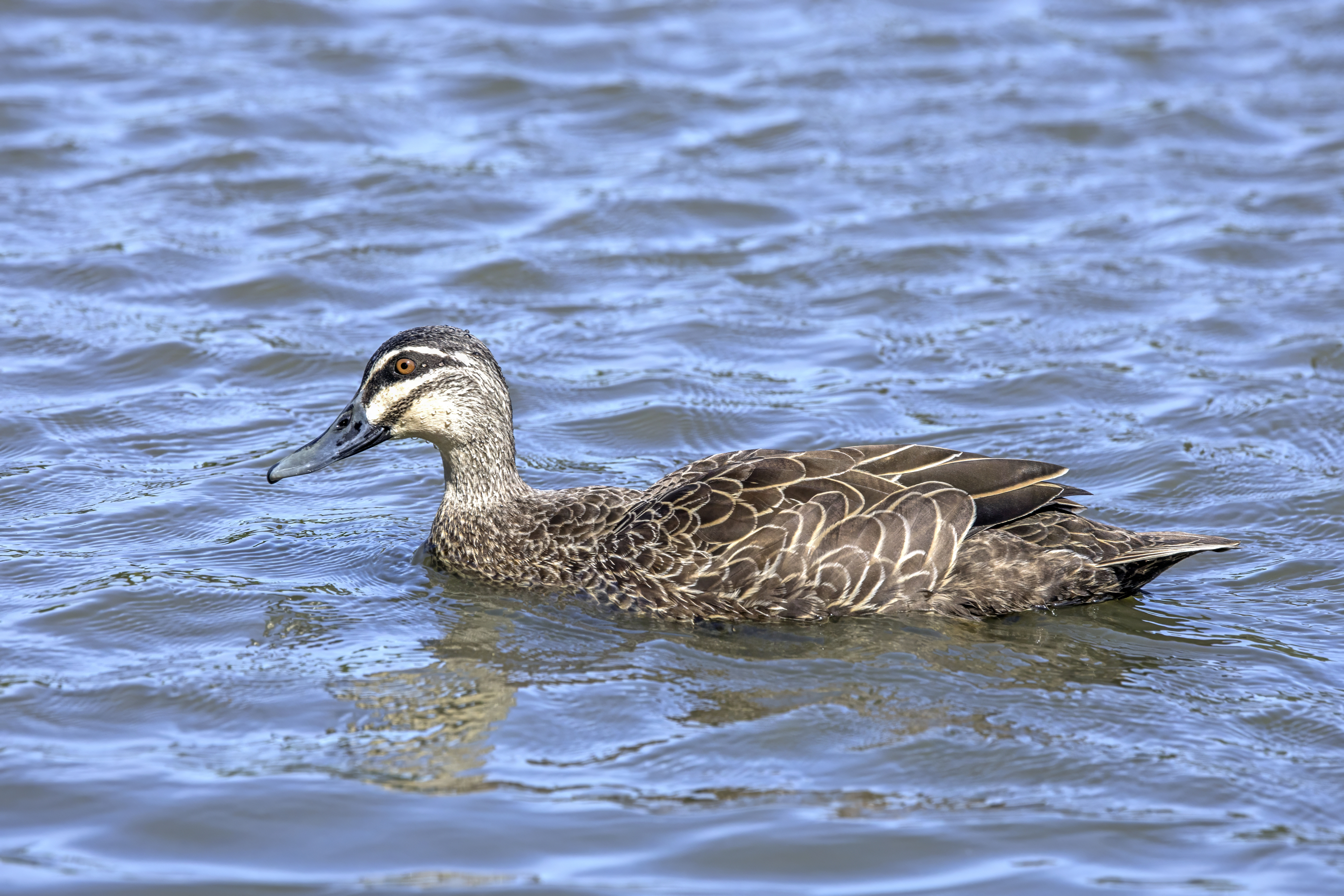
- Male at Centennial Park, Sydney

Conservation status
- Least Concern (IUCN 3.1)

Scientific classification
- Kingdom: Animalia
- Phylum: Chordata
- Class: Aves
- Order: Anseriformes
- Family: Anatidae
- Genus: Anas
- Species: A. superciliosa

Binomial name
- Anas superciliosa Gmelin, 1789

Subspecies
- See text
- Natural range of the Pacific black duck

= Pacific black duck =

Pacific black duck Temporal range: Calabrian–Present

Species of bird

The Pacific black duck (Anas superciliosa), commonly known as the PBD or simply Pacific duck, is a dabbling duck found in much of Indonesia, New Guinea, Australia, New Zealand, and many islands in the southwestern Pacific, reaching to the Caroline Islands in the north and French Polynesia in the east. It is usually called the grey duck in New Zealand, where it is also known by its Māori name, pārera.

== Taxonomy ==
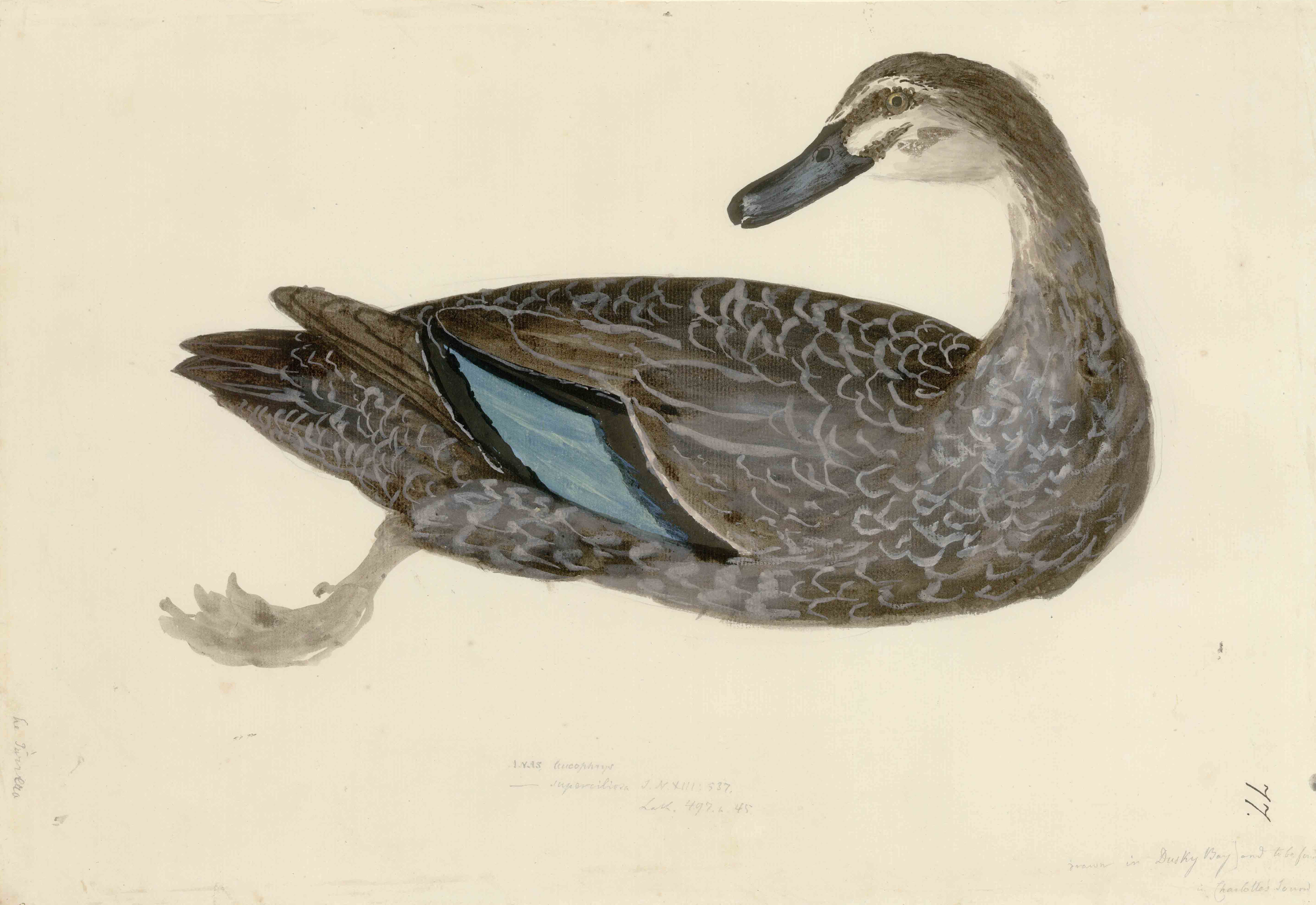
Watercolour made by Georg Forster on James Cook's second voyage to the Pacific Ocean. This painting is the holotype for the species.

The Pacific black duck was formally described in 1789 by the German naturalist Johann Friedrich Gmelin in his revised and expanded edition of Carl Linnaeus's Systema Naturae. He placed it with all the other ducks, geese and swans in the genus Anas and coined the binomial name Anas superciliosa. Gmelin based his description on the "Supercilious duck" that had been described in 1785 by the English ornithologist John Latham in his A General Synopsis of Birds. The naturalist Joseph Banks had provided Latham with a water-colour drawing of the duck by Georg Forster who had accompanied James Cook on his second voyage to the Pacific Ocean. His picture was drawn at Dusky Sound, a fiord on the southwest corner of New Zealand. This picture is the holotype for the species and is now held by the Natural History Museum in London. The genus name Anas is the Latin word for a duck. The specific epithet superciliosa is from Latin meaning "supercilious" or "eye-browed", a reference to the prominent supercilium or eye-stripe.

Two subspecies are now recognised:

- A. s. pelewensis Hartlaub & Finsch, 1872 – island black duck, breeds on the southwest Pacific islands and northern New Guinea
- A. s. superciliosa Gmelin, JF, 1789 − Australasian duck, breeds in Indonesia, southern New Guinea, Australia and New Zealand, where it is known as the grey duck or pārera.
- Anas superciliosa × platyrhynchos (Pacific Black Duck × Mallard)

A third subspecies, rogersi from Australia, has sometimes been recognised but it not distinguishable either genetically or phenotypically from the nominate race.

== Description ==
This sociable duck is found in a variety of wetland habitats, and its nesting habits are much like those of the mallard, which is encroaching on its range in New Zealand. It feeds by upending, like other Anas ducks.

It has a dark body, and a paler head with a dark crown and facial stripes. In flight, it shows a green speculum and pale underwing. All plumages are similar. The size range is 54–61 cm (21–24 in); males tend to be larger than females, and some island forms are smaller and darker than the main populations. It is not resident on the Marianas islands, but sometimes occurs there during migration. The now-extinct Mariana mallard was probably originally derived from hybrids between this species and the mallard, which came to the islands during migration and settled there.

Like its relatives the mallard and American black duck, the Pacific black duck is one of a number of duck species that can quack, with the female producing a sequence of raucous, rapid quacking which decreases in volume.

== Behaviour ==
=== Breeding ===
The nest is usually placed in a hole in a tree, but sometimes an old nest of a corvid is used and occasionally the nest will be placed on the ground. The clutch of 8–10 pale cream eggs is incubated only by the female. The eggs hatch after 26–32 days. The precocial downy ducklings leave the nest site when dry and are cared for by the female. They can fly when around 58 days of age.

=== Diet ===
The Pacific black duck is mainly vegetarian, feeding on seeds of aquatic plants. This diet is supplemented with small crustaceans, molluscs and aquatic insects. Food is obtained by 'dabbling', where the bird plunges its head and neck underwater and upends, raising its rear end vertically out of the water. Occasionally, food is sought on land in damp grassy areas.

== Conservation status ==
The Pacific black duck has declined sharply in numbers in New Zealand and several Australian islands due to competition from and hybridisation with the introduced mallard. Rhymer et al. (1994) say their data "points to the eventual loss of identity of the grey duck as a separate species in New Zealand, and the subsequent dominance of a hybrid swarm akin to the Mariana Mallard." Studies of their three species of parasitic feather lice support this prediction. This same impact is occurring in many areas of Australia, Tasmania and Adelaide in particular.

It was assumed that far more mallard drakes mate with grey duck females than vice versa based on the fact that most hybrids show a mallard-type plumage, but this is not correct; it appears that the mallard phenotype is dominant, and that the degree to which species contributed to a hybrid's ancestry cannot be determined from the plumage. The main reasons for displacement of the grey duck seem to be physical dominance of the larger mallards, combined with a marked population decline of the grey duck due to overhunting in the mid-20th century.

== Various views and plumages ==
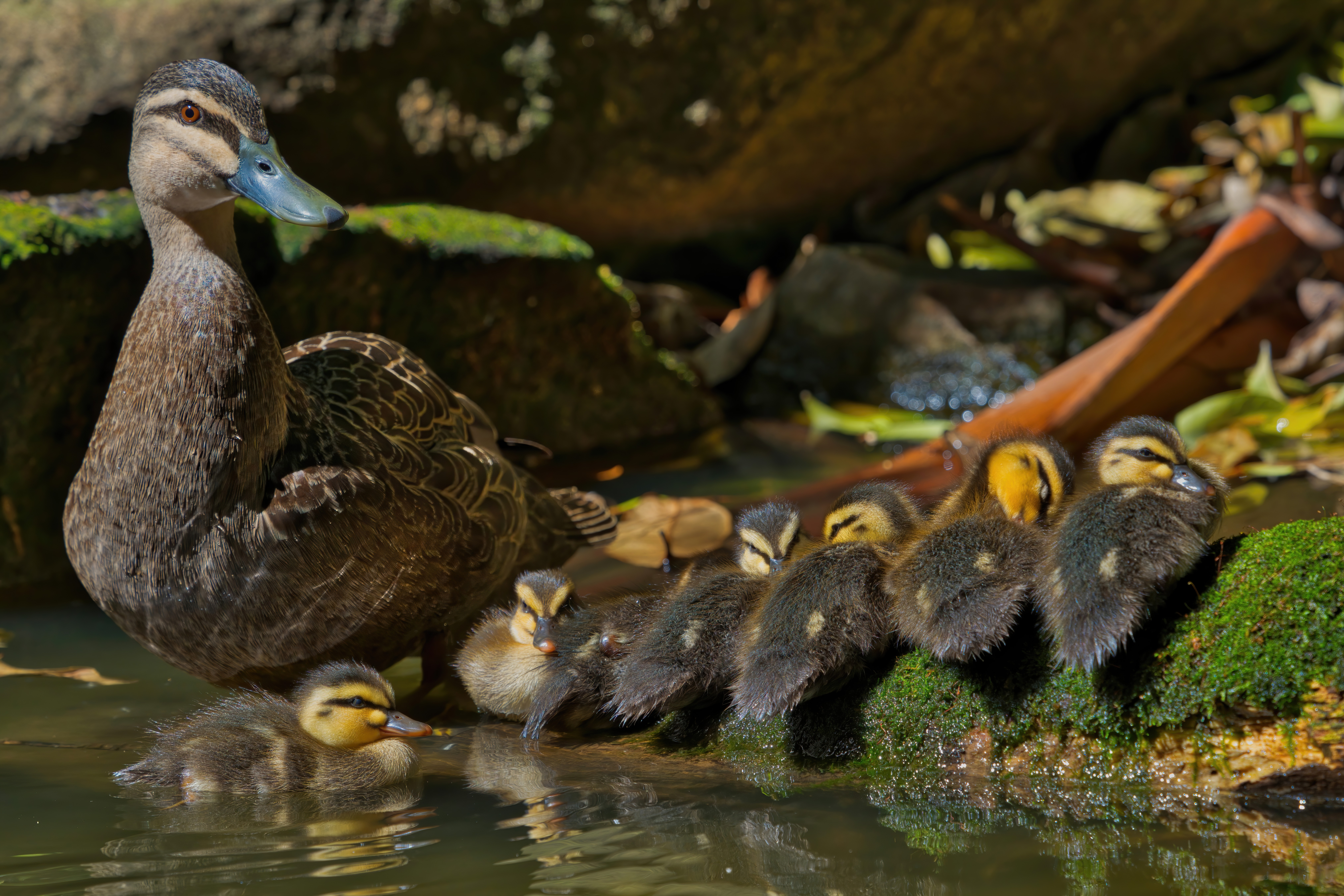
Female with ducklings

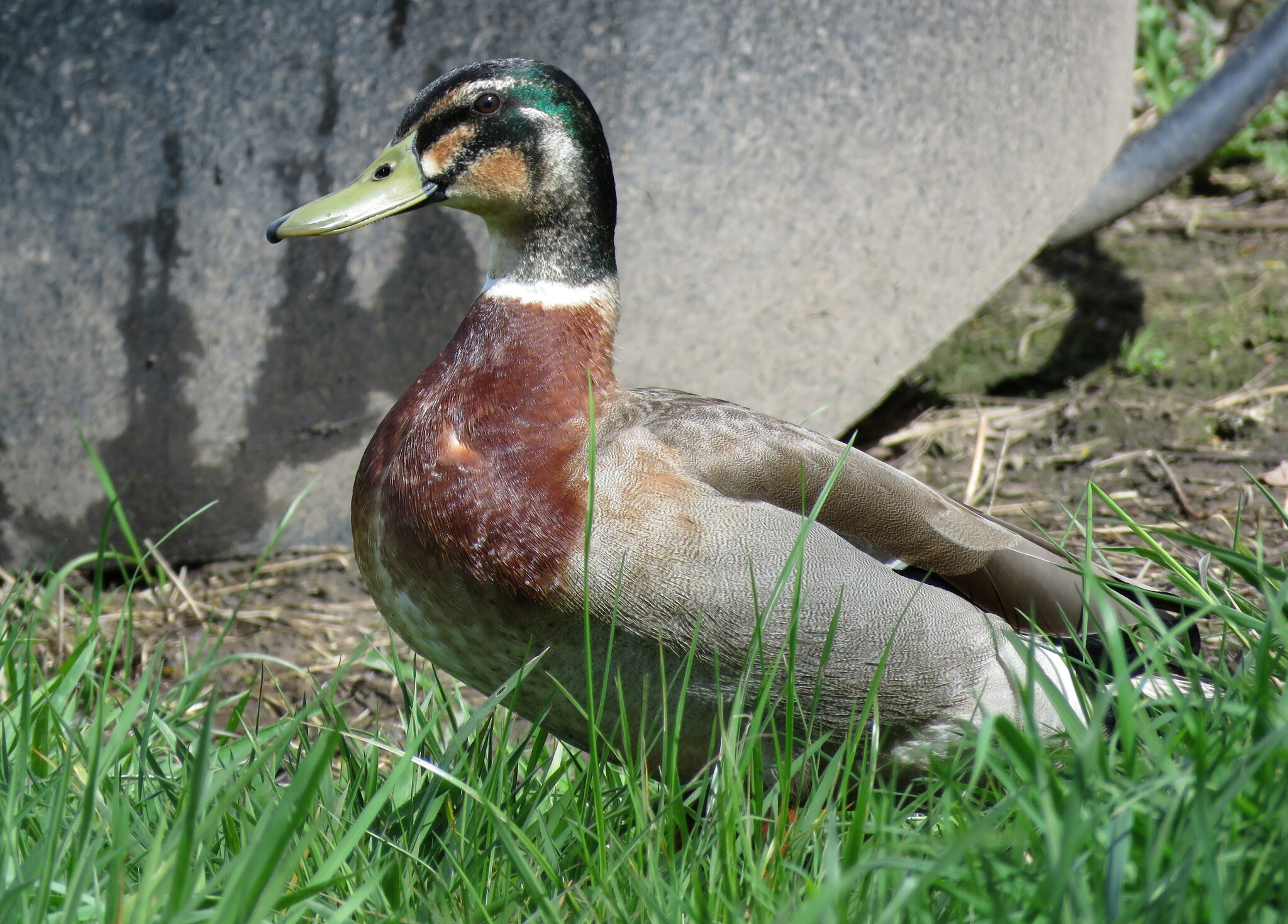
Male mallard x Pacific black duck hybrid

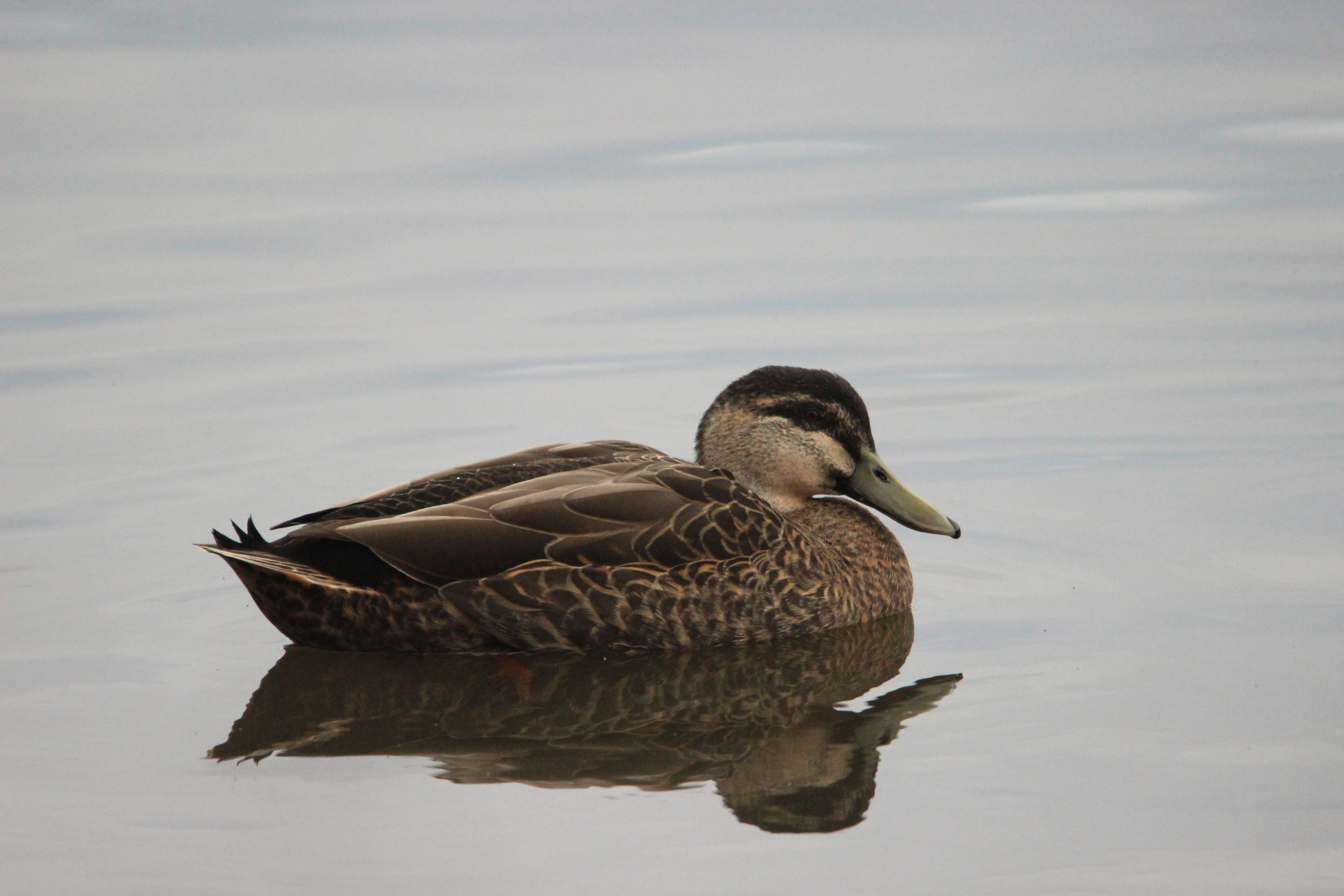
Mallard x Pacific black duck hybrid, Hobart

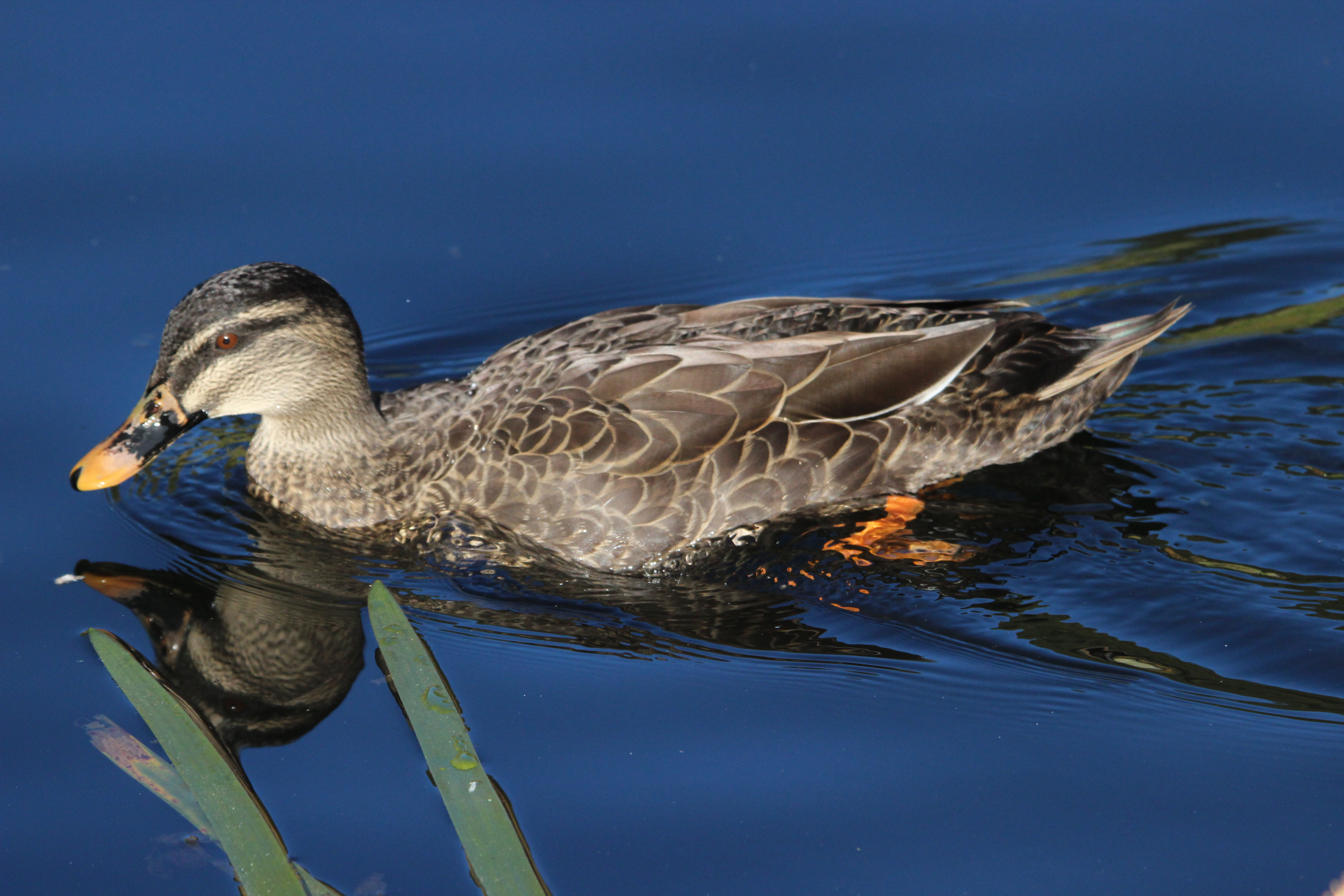
Mallard x Pacific black duck hybrid, Richmond Tasmania

== See also ==
- Dalvirus anatis
