= Saint-Cast-le-Guildo =

Saint-Cast-le-Guildo Sant-Kast-ar-Gwildoù
- Commune
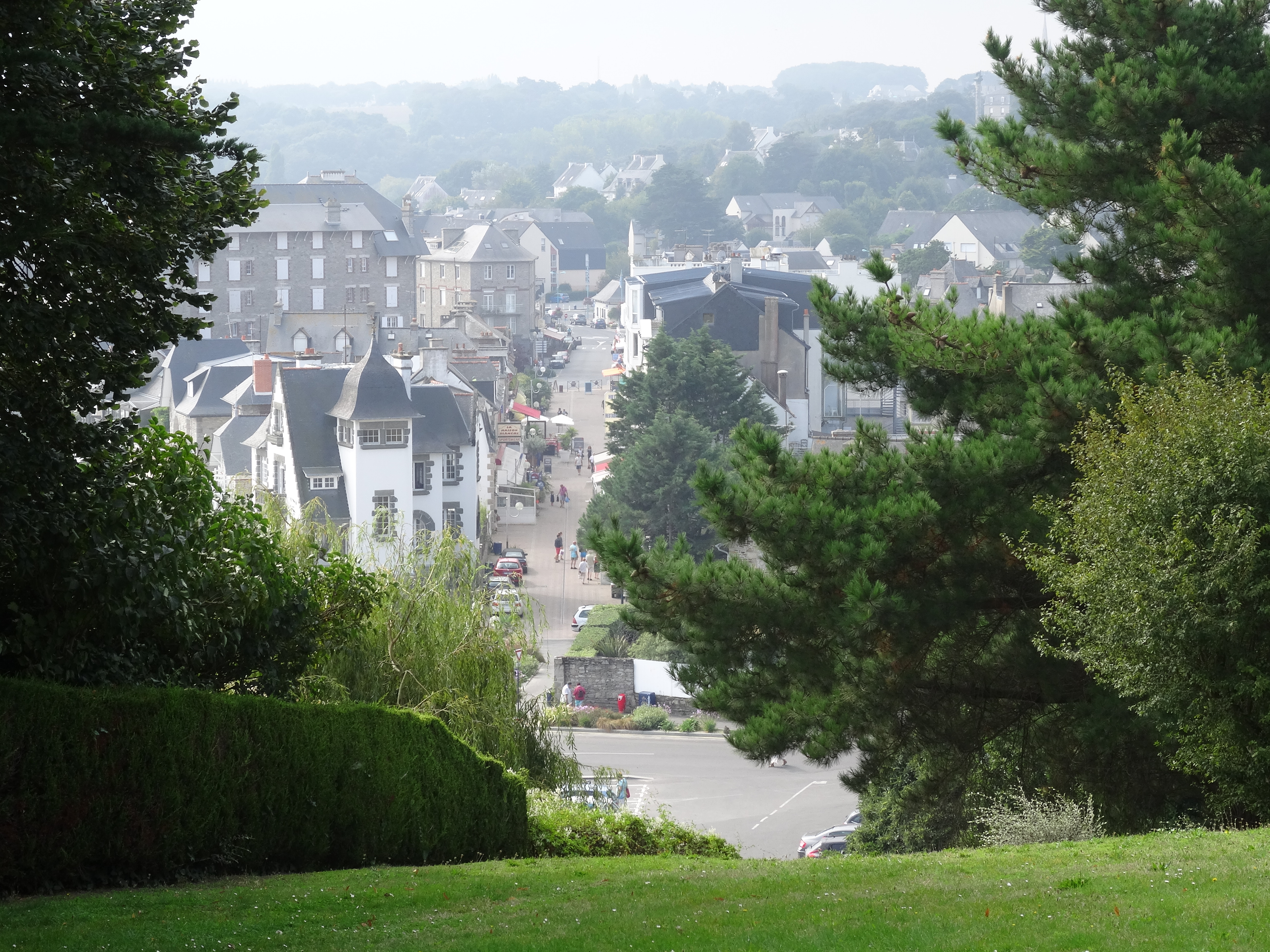
- Partial view of Saint-Cast-le-Guildo

- Coat of arms
- Location of Saint-Cast-le-Guildo
- Location within France Location within Brittany
- Coordinates: 48°37′48″N 2°15′24″W
- Country: France
- Region: Brittany
- Department: Côtes-d'Armor
- Arrondissement: Dinan
- Canton: Pléneuf-Val-André
- Intercommunality: Dinan Agglomération

Government
  - Mayor (2020–2026): Marie-Madeleine Michel
- Area^{1}: 22.63 km^{2} (8.74 sq mi)
- Highest elevation: 76 m (249 ft)
- Lowest elevation: 0 m (0 ft)
- Population (2023): 3,371
  - Density: 149.0/km^{2} (385.8/sq mi)
- Time zone: UTC+01:00 (CET)
  - Summer (DST): UTC+02:00 (CEST)
- INSEE/Postal code: 22282 /22380
- Website: tourist office
- ^{1} French Land Register data, which excludes lakes, ponds, glaciers > 1 km^{2} (0.386 sq mi or 247 acres) and river estuaries.

Saint-Cast-le-Guildo (French pronunciation: [sɛ̃ ka lə ɡildo]; Breton: Sant-Kast-ar-Gwildoù; Gallo: Saent-Cast-le-Giledo) is a commune in the Côtes-d'Armor department of Brittany in northwestern France. It is port city on the English Channel as it also has a nautical center, the Centre Nautique de Saint-Cast (CNSC) ranked 3rd to 6th in the nation.

The river Arguenon flows through the commune, where it empties into the sea.

== History ==
The Battle of St Cast took place on September 11, 1758, when the French repelled the English. The English first attacked the region of Dinard by sea, but were stopped at the Rance by the Vauban fortifications. They were forced to retreat to their fleet in front of St-Cast, where Emmanuel-Armand de Richelieu was waiting for them and launched an attack on the beach while the British were fleeing back onto their vessels. The casualties were heavy for the British army as they lost 3,100 soldiers; the French lost about 495 men. Today there is a monument in the Bourg (neighborhood of St-Cast) showing a greyhound defeating a lion; the Castins defeating a lion (the English symbol).

== Population ==
Inhabitants of Saint-Cast-le-Guildo are called castins in French. In 1971 the former commune of Notre-Dame-de-Guildo was absorbed into Saint-Cast-le-Guildo.

Historical population

Year	Pop.	±% p.a.
1793	1,232	—
1800	1,168	−0.76%
1806	1,384	+2.87%
1821	1,444	+0.28%
1831	1,481	+0.25%
1836	1,402	−1.09%
1841	1,421	+0.27%
1846	1,476	+0.76%
1851	1,558	+1.09%
1856	1,511	−0.61%
1861	1,400	−1.51%
1866	1,499	+1.38%
1872	1,380	−1.37%
1876	1,516	+2.38%
1881	1,592	+0.98%
1886	1,553	−0.49%
1891	1,626	+0.92%
1896	1,717	+1.10%
1901	1,717	+0.00%

Year	Pop.	±% p.a.
1906	1,864	+1.66%
1911	2,076	+2.18%
1921	2,013	−0.31%
1926	2,166	+1.48%
1931	2,263	+0.88%
1936	2,201	−0.55%
1946	2,330	+0.57%
1954	2,159	−0.95%
1962	2,179	+0.12%
1968	2,227	+0.36%
1975	3,105	+4.86%
1982	3,165	+0.27%
1990	3,093	−0.29%
1999	3,187	+0.33%
2007	3,420	+0.89%
2012	3,447	+0.16%
2017	3,315	−0.78%
2023	3,371	+0.28%

Source: EHESS and INSEE (1975–2023)

== Food ==
Saint-Cast features many of the typical dishes of Breton cuisine, such as the Kouign-amann, or the local specialty, Le Castin, which is originally what we call people from there, or in this case the cake.

== Notable people ==
- Lucienne Heuvelmans (1881–1944), sculptor and illustrator
- Jean-Frédéric Émile Oustalet (1844–1905), ornoithologist, died in Saint-Cast-le-Guildo
- Irène Aïtoff (1904–2006), classical pianist and vocal coach
- Anne Beaumanoir (1923–2022), neurophysiologist, one of the Righteous Among the Nations

== Climate ==
Saint-Cast-le-Guildo has an oceanic climate (Köppen climate classification Cfb). The average annual temperature in Saint-Cast-le-Guildo is 12.0 °C (53.6 °F). The average annual rainfall is 693.0 mm (27.28 in) with October as the wettest month. The temperatures are highest on average in August, at around 18.0 °C (64.4 °F), and lowest in February, at around 6.8 °C (44.2 °F). The highest temperature ever recorded in Saint-Cast-le-Guildo was 39.0 °C (102.2 °F) on 5 August 2003; the coldest temperature ever recorded was −11.4 °C (11.5 °F) on 17 January 1985.

Climate data for Saint-Cast-le-Guildo (1981–2010 averages, extremes 1951−present)
Month	Jan	Feb	Mar	Apr	May	Jun	Jul	Aug	Sep	Oct	Nov	Dec	Year
Record high °C (°F)	16.2 (61.2)	19.8 (67.6)	23.3 (73.9)	26.1 (79.0)	29.4 (84.9)	33.6 (92.5)	36.6 (97.9)	39.0 (102.2)	31.8 (89.2)	29.8 (85.6)	20.6 (69.1)	18.0 (64.4)	39.0 (102.2)
Mean daily maximum °C (°F)	9.2 (48.6)	9.3 (48.7)	11.5 (52.7)	13.0 (55.4)	15.9 (60.6)	18.5 (65.3)	20.7 (69.3)	21.1 (70.0)	19.6 (67.3)	16.3 (61.3)	12.4 (54.3)	9.7 (49.5)	14.8 (58.6)
Daily mean °C (°F)	6.9 (44.4)	6.8 (44.2)	8.7 (47.7)	10.0 (50.0)	12.9 (55.2)	15.4 (59.7)	17.6 (63.7)	18.0 (64.4)	16.5 (61.7)	13.5 (56.3)	10.0 (50.0)	7.4 (45.3)	12.0 (53.6)
Mean daily minimum °C (°F)	4.5 (40.1)	4.3 (39.7)	5.9 (42.6)	7.1 (44.8)	9.8 (49.6)	12.4 (54.3)	14.4 (57.9)	14.9 (58.8)	13.4 (56.1)	10.7 (51.3)	7.5 (45.5)	5.2 (41.4)	9.2 (48.6)
Record low °C (°F)	−11.4 (11.5)	−8.6 (16.5)	−4.2 (24.4)	−1.0 (30.2)	1.6 (34.9)	5.2 (41.4)	7.2 (45.0)	6.4 (43.5)	5.2 (41.4)	2.0 (35.6)	−3.0 (26.6)	−8.2 (17.2)	−11.4 (11.5)
Average precipitation mm (inches)	65.6 (2.58)	55.3 (2.18)	51.9 (2.04)	48.8 (1.92)	54.7 (2.15)	41.6 (1.64)	42.7 (1.68)	43.8 (1.72)	55.7 (2.19)	80.0 (3.15)	78.0 (3.07)	74.9 (2.95)	693.0 (27.28)
Average precipitation days (≥ 1.0 mm)	12.9	10.7	10.7	10.0	9.6	7.2	7.2	7.3	9.0	12.8	13.4	13.2	124.0
Source: Météo France

== See also ==
- Communes of the Côtes-d'Armor department
- https://sites.google.com/site/alderneylocalhistory/Home/1700s/1758-battle-of-st-cast
