= Theodore Dury =

English cricketer

Theodore Seton Dury (12 June 1854 – 20 March 1932) was an English first-class cricketer, who played seven games for Oxford University, and thirteen matches for Yorkshire from 1878 to 1881, both as an amateur. He also appeared in matches for the England XI, Gentlemen of England, Gentlemen of the North and Marylebone Cricket Club.

Born in Ripley, Yorkshire, England, Dury was educated at Harrow School, playing for the cricket eleven in 1870. He went up to St John's College, Oxford, playing for them in 1875 and 1876, when he gained his blue. He also represented his University at rackets.

A right-handed batsman, he scored 565 runs in all first-class cricket, with a best of 46 against I Zingari, at an average of 13.78. A right-arm medium roundarm bowler, he took three wickets at 52.66, with a best of 2 for 38 against Middlesex.

He gained his Bachelor of Arts in 1877 and became a solicitor, working first for the London and South Western Railway, and then for the School Board for London. He later became a Taxing Master at the Supreme Court in London and was Chief Master when he retired in 1930. He died in March 1932, in Earl's Court, Kensington, London. His son Guy Dury was also a first-class cricketer, as well as a British Army officer.
