= Battle of Saint-Cast =

1758 battle of the Seven Years' War

- Part of the Seven Years' War
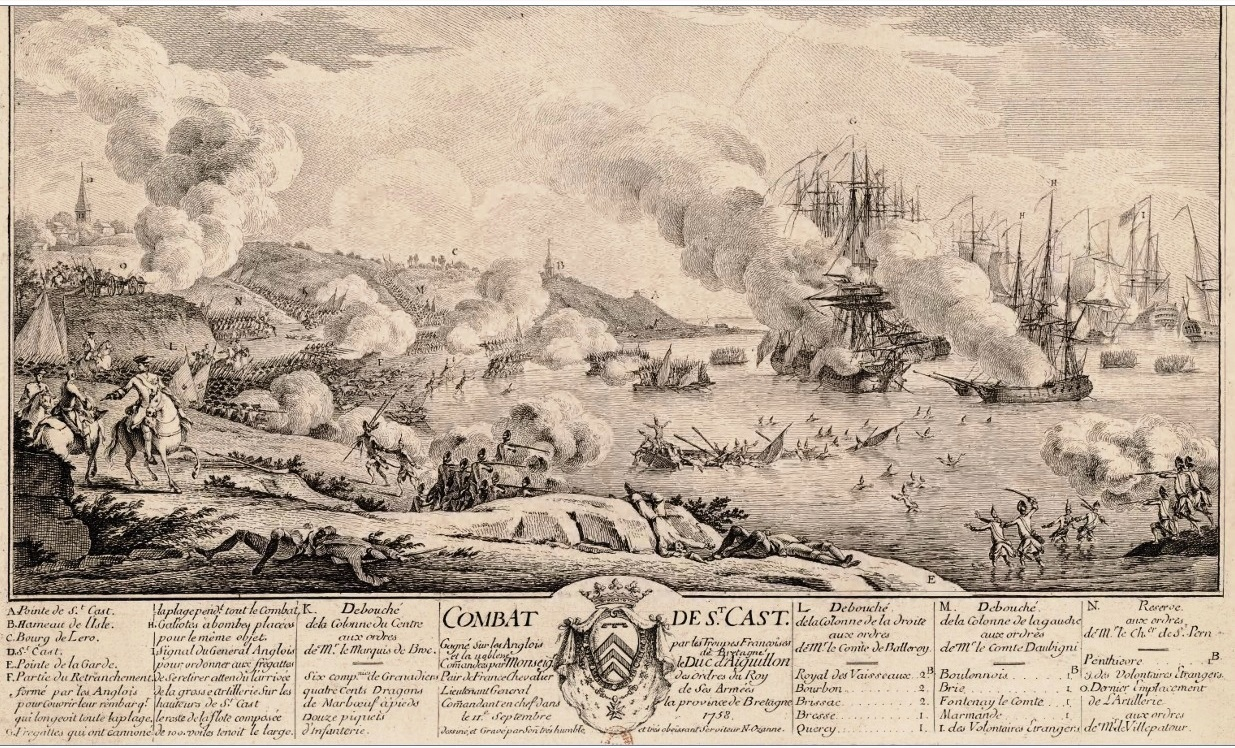
- Engraving by Nicolas Ozanne
| Date | 11 September 1758 |
| Location | near Saint-Cast, France 48.6300°N 2.2567°W |
| Result | French victory |

Belligerents
| Great Britain | France |

Commanders and leaders
| (Kingdom of Great Britain) Thomas Bligh (Kingdom of Great Britain) Alexander Dury † (Kingdom of Great Britain) George Anson (Kingdom of Great Britain) Richard Howe | (Kingdom of France) Richelieu, duc d'Aiguillon (Kingdom of France) Marquis d'Aubigné |

Strength
| over 10,000 soldiers 32,500 seamen | 8,000–9,000 soldiers and militiamen |

Casualties and losses
| 2,300 killed or wounded 800 prisoners | 155 killed 340 wounded |

The Battle of Saint-Cast was a military engagement during the Seven Years' War on the French coast between British naval and land expeditionary forces and French coastal defence forces. Fought on 11 September 1758, it was won by the French, as they attacked a numerically superior British field force and drove it back to the ships, having suffered relatively minor casualties.

During the Seven Years' War, Britain mounted numerous amphibious expeditions against France and French possessions around the world. In 1758 a number of expeditions, then called descents, were made against the northern coast of France. The military objectives of the descents were to capture and destroy French ports, divert French land forces from Germany, and suppress privateers operating from the French coast. The battle of Saint-Cast was the final engagement of a descent in force that ended in a French victory.

== Background ==
The expedition contained sizable naval and land forces. The naval forces were two squadrons consisting of: Admiral Anson's 22 ships of the line with 9 frigates crewed by 15,500 men and Commodore Howe's 1 ship of the line of 64 guns, 4 of 50 guns, 10 frigates, 5 sloops, 2 fire-ships, 2 bomb ketches, 6,000 sailors, 6,000 marines, 100 transports, 20 tenders, 10 store-ships and 10 cutters with crews totaling some 5,000 merchant seamen. The land forces were four infantry brigades consisting of: the Guards Brigade made up of the 1st battalions of the 1st, Coldstream and 3rd Foot Guards and three brigades made up of the 5th, 24th, 30th, 33rd, 34th, 36th, 38th, 67th, 68th and 72nd Regiments of Foot, as well as an artillery train of 60 cannon with 400 artillerymen and a few hundred Light Dragoon cavalry, totaling over 10,000 soldiers.

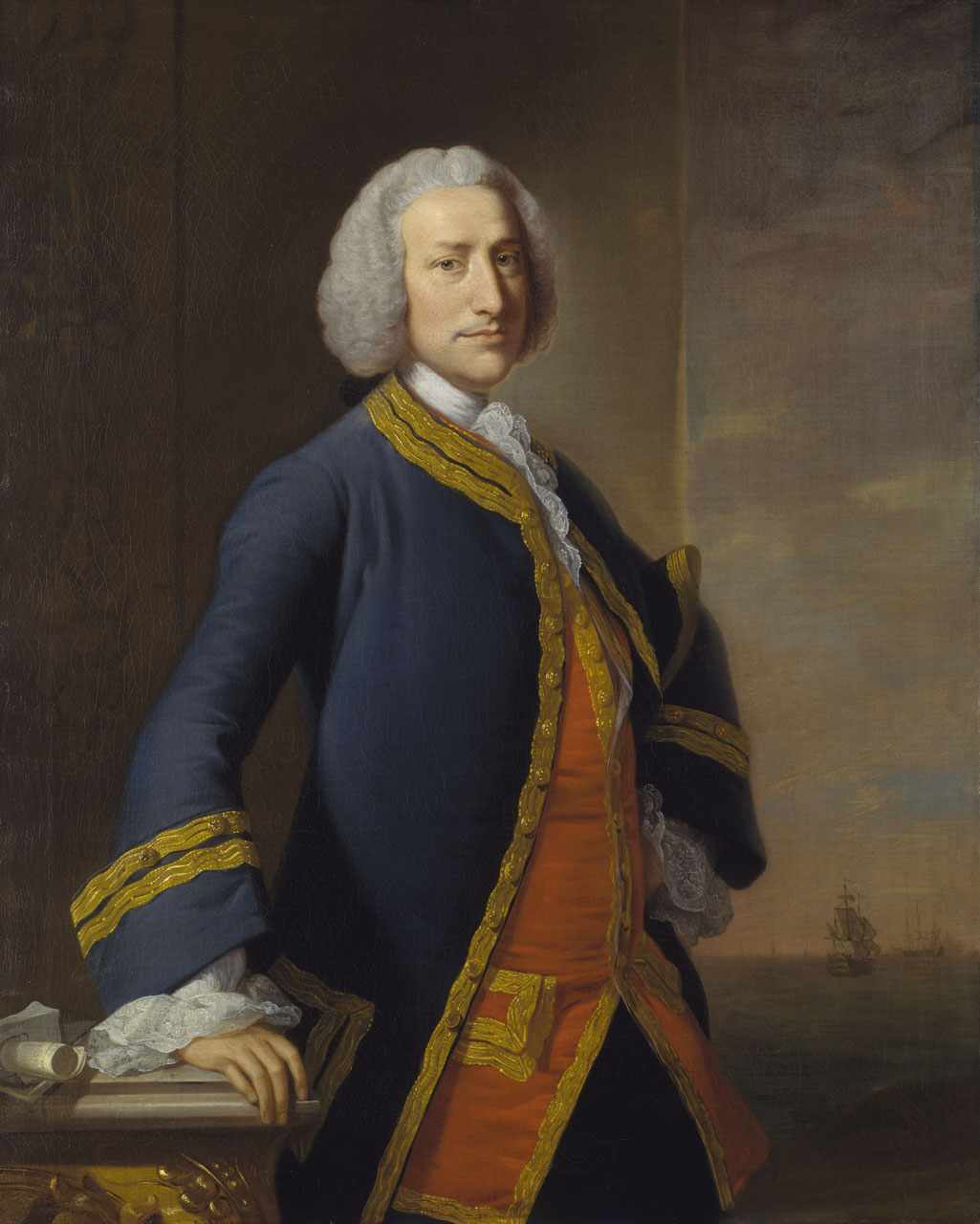
Admiral Lord Anson

Britain's naval forces were under the command of Admiral Lord Anson, seconded by Commodore Howe. Britain's land forces were commanded by Lieutenant-General Thomas Bligh. Against this the French had numerous garrison troops and militia spread thinly over the northern coast of France that would have to be concentrated at whichever place the British landed.

Initially the expedition met with considerable success capturing the port of Cherbourg. The British destroyed the port, the docks and the ships harbored there, carrying off or destroying considerable war material and goods.

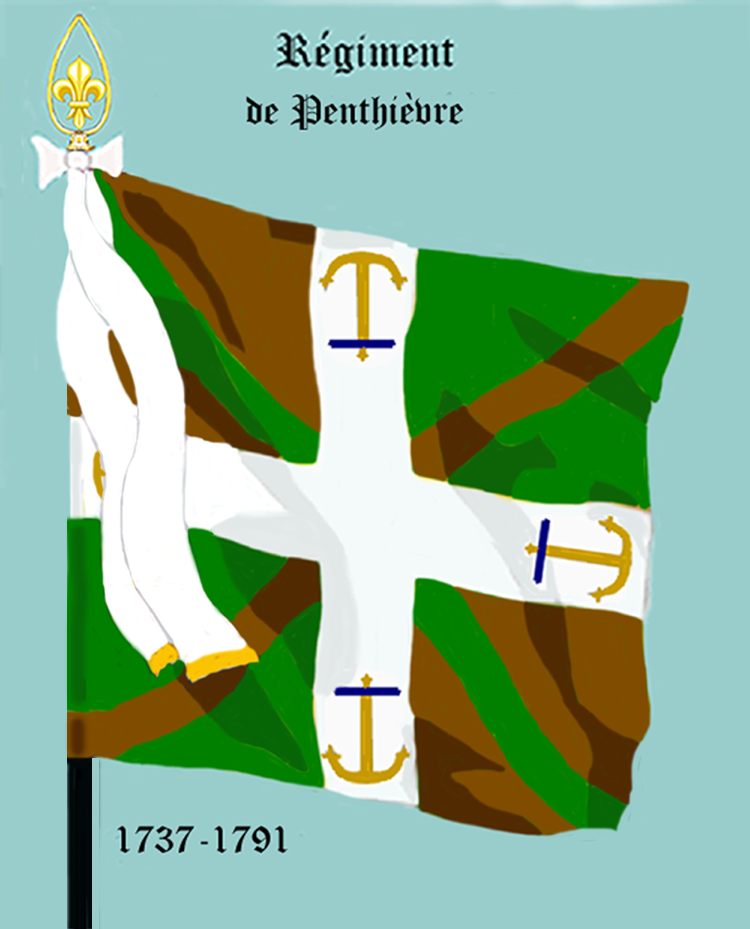
Colors of the French Regiment Penthièvre

French troops from various places began moving on Cherbourg and the British expedition re-embarked to move against Saint Malo on 5 September but it was found to be too well defended. The weather now turned against the British as well and it was decided it would be safer to re-embark the land forces further west in the bay of Saint Cast near the small village of Saint-Cast and the towns of Le Guildo and Matignon. The fleet sailed ahead while the army marched overland on 7 September, engaging in skirmishes on the 7th, 8th and 9th. On 10 September the Coldstream Guards were sent ahead to Saint Cast to collect provisions and convoy them back to the army. Lieutenant-General Bligh with the army camped at Matignon some 3 miles (4.8 km) from Saint-Cast.

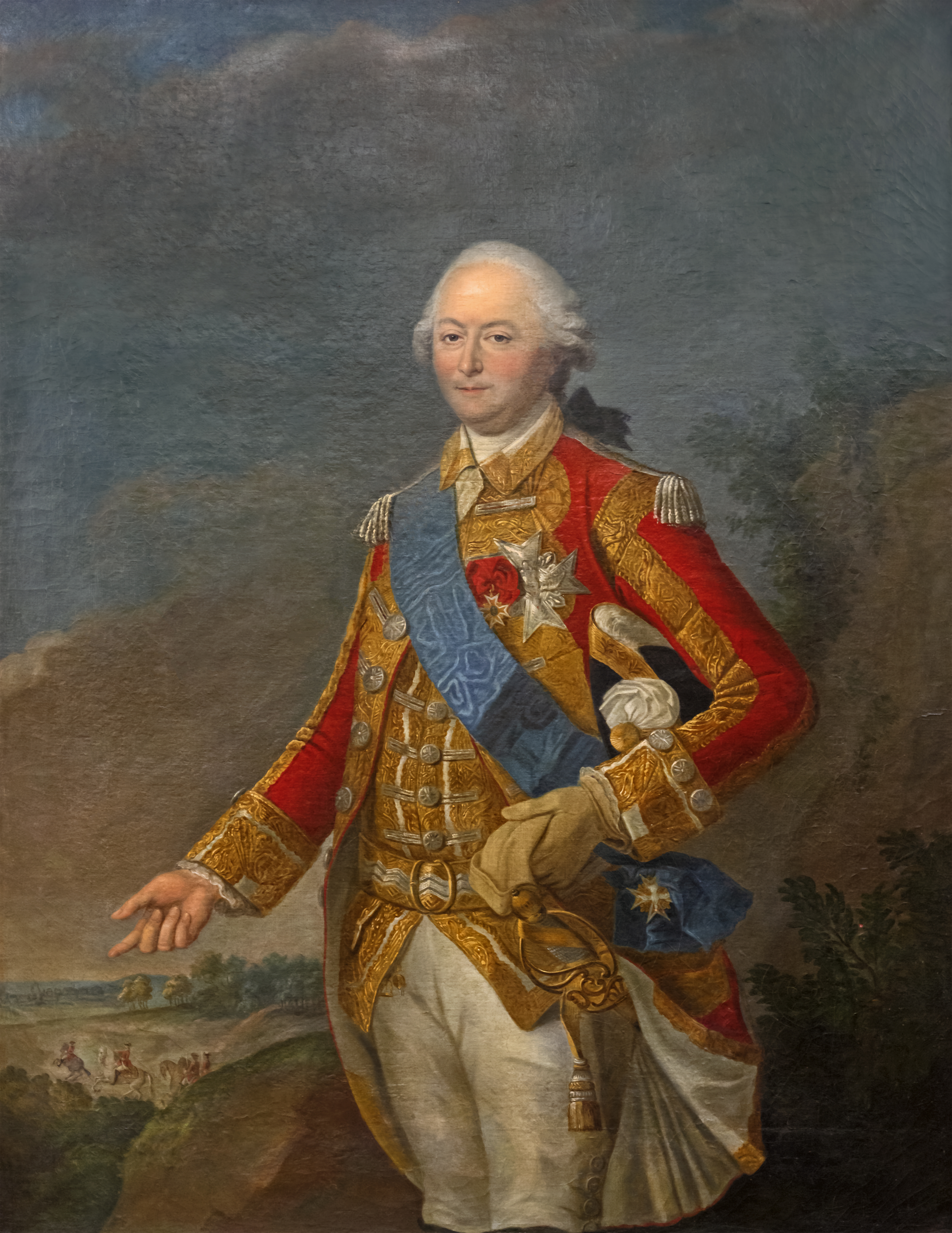
Richelieu, duc d'Aiguillon

During this time Richelieu, duc d'Aiguillon, military commander of Brittany, had gathered some 12 regular line infantry battalions, including: Régiment Royal des Vaisseaux, Régiment Volontaires Étrangers, Régiment de Bourbon, Régiment de Bresse, Régiment de Quercy, Régiment de Penthièvre, Régiment de Marmande, from the garrison of Saint-Malo and a brigade of the Regiment de Fontenay-le-Comte, Régiment de Brie and Régiment de Boulonnais. They also had 6 squadrons of cavalry, some companies of coastal militia, and several artillery batteries. The French army amounting to 8,000 or 9,000 men, under the field command of Marquis d'Aubigné, was fast marching on Saint-Cast from Brest by way of the town of Lamballe and from the town of Dinan.

== The battle ==
Bligh broke camp by 3:00 in the morning of the 11th and reached the beach at Saint-Cast before 9:00 but the embarcation went very slowly. The transports stood well off shore and the flat-bottomed landing boats used to carry some 70 men each were initially employed loading supplies, artillery, livestock and horses. Hardly any soldiers had embarked when the French appeared and began a cannonade of the beach.

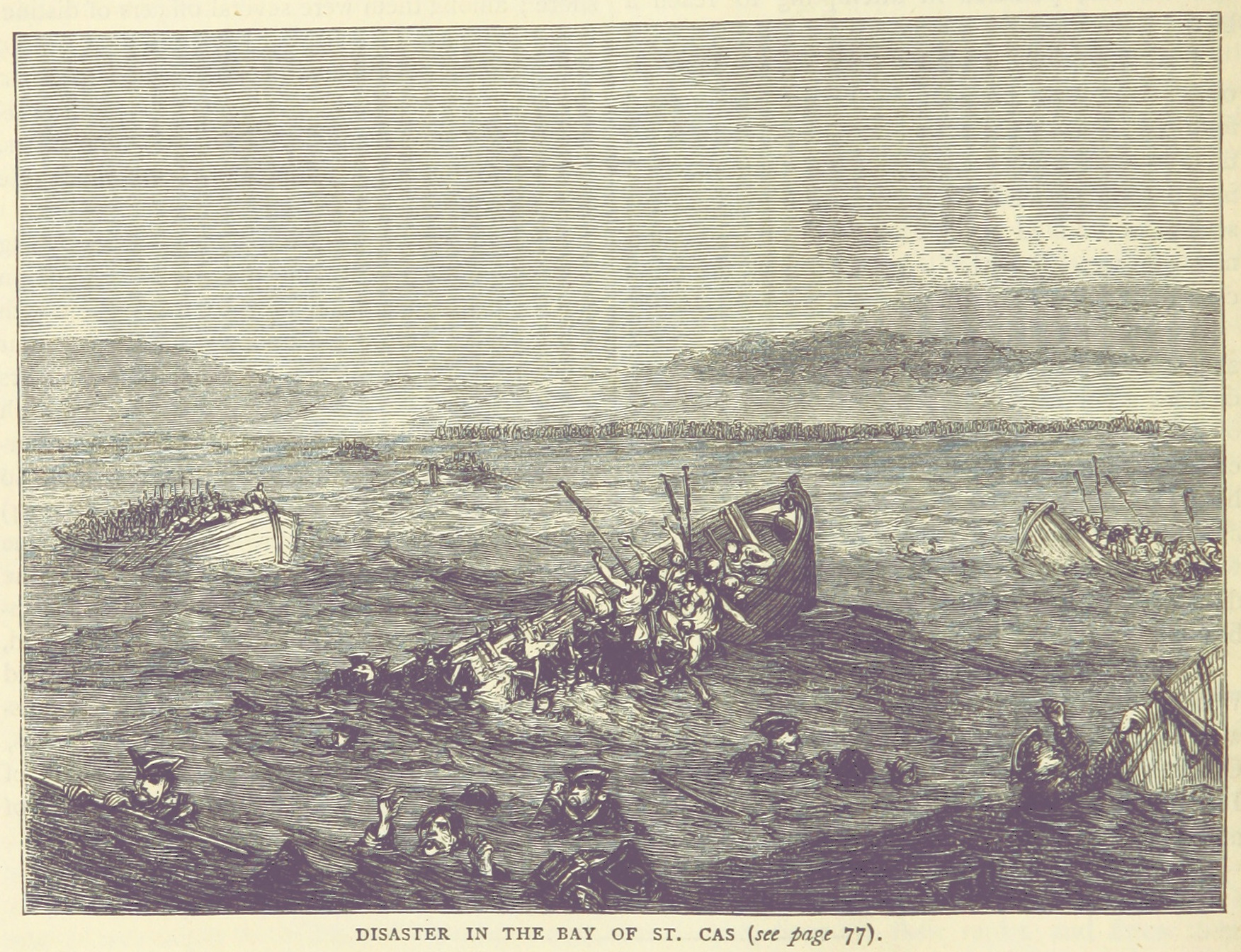
A landing boat sinks as the British retreat

Bligh had formed the 1st Foot Guards and the grenadier companies of the line regiments into a rear guard of about 1,500 men under the command of the Guards Brigade commander, Major-General Dury, to cover the withdrawal of the army from behind some dunes along the beach. A great deal of confusion and panic set in among the British in the hurry to get off the beach. The French forces moved down a covered way to the beach and deployed three brigades into line with a fourth in reserve. The five frigates and the bomb ketches tried to cover the British embarkation and their fire disordered and drove back the French line for a while. The French artillery batteries were well positioned on higher ground commanding the beach and the bay. They exchanged shots with the ships of the fleet, and sank three landing boats full of soldiers; other landing boats were damaged on the beach. When the British troops remaining ashore were some 3,000, the French closed in. Under fire from the British fleet, the French advanced against the final British position led by a battalion of 300 men of combined grenadier companies in a bayonet charge commanded by the Marquis de Cussi and Comte de Montaigu. The rear guard under Dury attempted a counter-attack in which he was fatally wounded and the 1st Foot Guards and line grenadiers broke and fled into the sea with 800 killed and over 700 taken prisoner. The French infantry pursued the stragglers into waist-deep water until the fleet ceased fire, at which point they attended to the British wounded, having suffered about 300 casualties themselves.

In all, the British suffered casualties of 2,300 killed and wounded, as well as 800 prisoners. French regular troops lost 155 killed and 340 wounded; militia losses are not included.

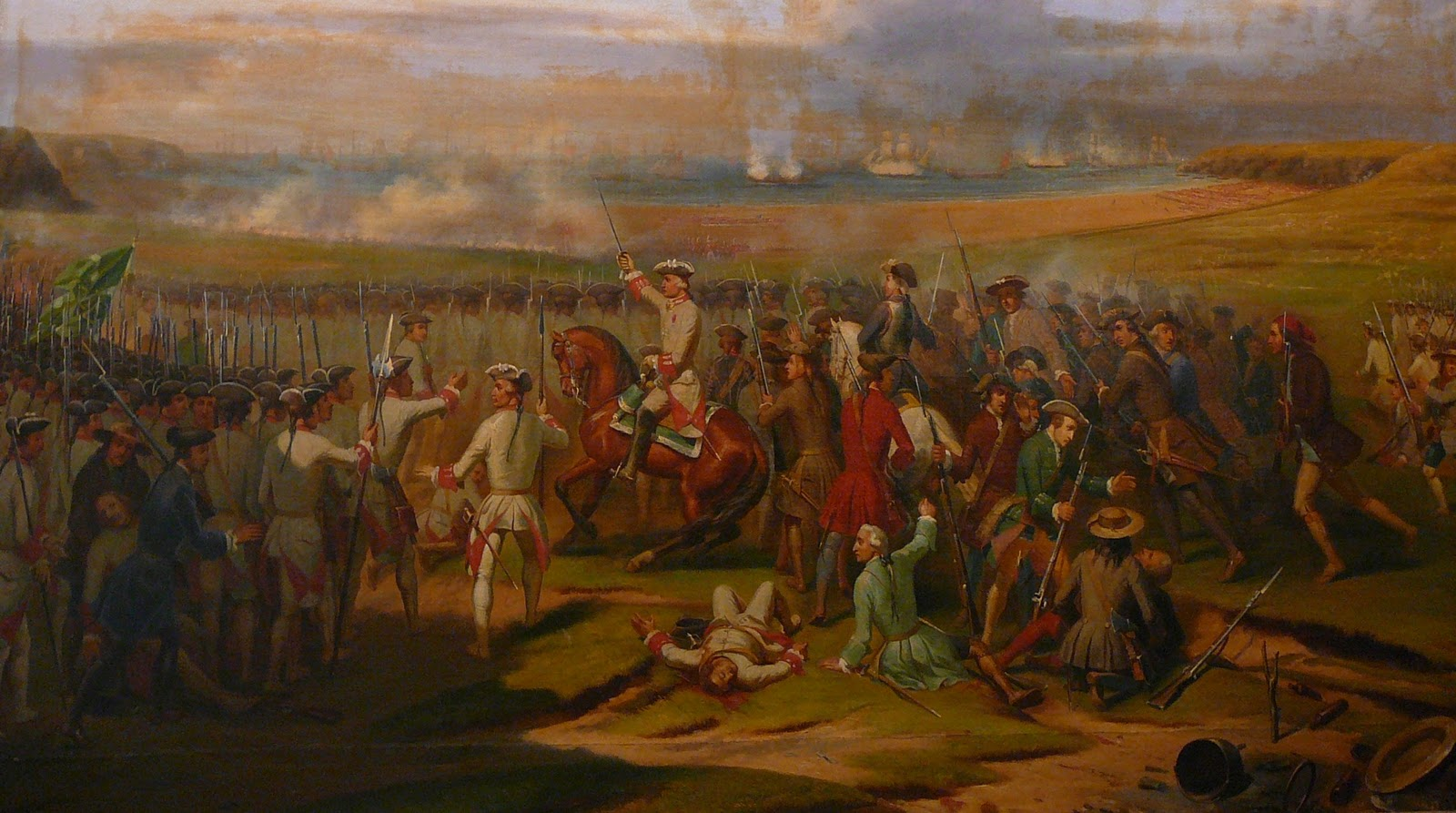
Depiction of the battle from a French perspective

== Aftermath ==
While the British continued such expeditions against French colonies and islands beyond the reach of the French land forces, this was the last attempt by an amphibious expedition in force against the coast of France during the Seven Years' War. The fiasco of the embarcation from Saint-Cast helped convince British Prime Minister Pitt to send instead military aid and troops to fight alongside Ferdinand and Frederick the Great on the continent of Europe. The negative potential for another disaster and expense of expeditions this size was considered to outweigh the temporary gain of the raids.

The French had this to say about their own performance:

"Si les Bretons s'étaient couverts de gloire, le petit Duc (d'Aiguillon) s'était couvert de farine." (If the Bretons were covered with glory, the little duke was covered with flour.)

This quote refers to the location of the headquarters at the mill of Moulin d'Anne, where it is rumoured that the Duke of Aiguillon was entertained by the miller.

== See also ==
- Great Britain in the Seven Years' War
- France in the Seven Years' War
