= Guy Dury =

English cricketer and British Army officer

Personal information
- Full name: Guy Alexander Ingram Dury
- Born: 4 December 1895; Harrow-on-the-Hill, Middlesex, England
- Died: 10 August 1976 (aged 80); Eastbourne, Sussex, England
- Batting: Unknown
- Bowling: Unknown
- Relatives: Theodore Dury (father)

Career statistics
Competition	First-class
Matches	3
Runs scored	70
Batting average	14.00
100s/50s	–/1
Top score	51
Balls bowled	198
Wickets	3
Bowling average	43.66
5 wickets in innings	–
10 wickets in match	–
Best bowling	2/51
Catches/stumpings	–/–
- Source: Cricinfo, 9 January 2019

Guy Alexander Ingram Dury MC (4 December 1895 – 10 August 1976) was an English cricketer and British Army officer. He served in both world wars with the London Regiment and the Grenadier Guards, winning the Military Cross during the First World War. He was a first-class cricketer who played for the British Army cricket team and the Free Foresters.

== Early life and World War I ==
The son of the first-class cricketer Theodore Dury and his wife Helen Isabella Ingram, Dury was born at Harrow-on-the-Hill. He was educated at Harrow School, where he played for the school cricket team in 1913 and 1914. He enlisted in the 4th Battalion, London Regiment in January 1915 as a second lieutenant. He served during World War I, firstly with the London Regiment where he gained the rank of temporary lieutenant in September 1915. He served in the later stages of the war with the 3rd Battalion of the Grenadier Guards, and was given the temporary rank of captain in April 1918. In June 1918 he received the Military Cross for "conspicuous gallantry and devotion to duty". Dury ran forwards from the support trenches to direct the defence of two forward posts under heavy machine gun fire.

During the Battle of Albert in August 1918 he led his company in an attack that cleared the German trenches and captured a village. Later in the day he fell victim to German gassing and was temporarily blinded. One of his men later recalled that while recovering in the bed next to Dury in hospital he was reprimanded by him for stating that he was "In the Grenadiers" rather than the more formal "Grenadier Guards".

In February 1918 he was one of just twenty guests at the wedding of ballerina Phyllis Bedells to fellow Grenadiers officer Ian MacBean.

== Later military career ==
Following the war, he was selected to play for H. D. G. Leveson Gower's cricket team in a first-class match against Cambridge University at Eastbourne in 1919. Having relinquished the temporary rank of captain in January 1920, Dury had his prior rank of lieutenant backdated in February 1921, with seniority to August 1917. He was selected to play first-class cricket for the British Army cricket team against Cambridge University at Cambridge in May 1922. He was promoted to the rank of captain in September 1923, having served as an adjutant vice-captain since May 1922. Dury made a third and final appearance in first-class cricket for the Free Foresters in June 1926 against Oxford University at Oxford, during which he made a half century with 51 in the Free Foresters first-innings. He retired from military service on 27 September 1931, retaining the rank of captain.

Following the outbreak of World War II Dury was recalled to the army. Serving once more with the Grenadier Guards, he was promoted to the rank of brevet major in May 1942. Dury served as the first commandant of a prisoner of war camp near Penrith, Cumbria, that held the German survivors of the sinking of the Bismarck. Two Luftwaffe officers later made a daring escape from the camp in which they managed to steal an RAF training plane from RAF Kingstown. After they ran out of fuel and were recaptured near Great Yarmouth, Dury is said to have remarked: "One really has to take off one's hat to them ... I really regret having to lock them up."

He exceeded the age to be recalled in August 1948, was removed from the reserve list of officers, and was granted the honorary rank of lieutenant colonel.

== Personal life ==
Dury married Rose Mary Dorothy Vernon-Harcourt (who had been a widow for 14 years) on 12 August 1949. He died at Eastbourne in August 1976.
