= Cherbourg raid =

1758 raid of the Seven Years' War

- Part of Seven Years' War
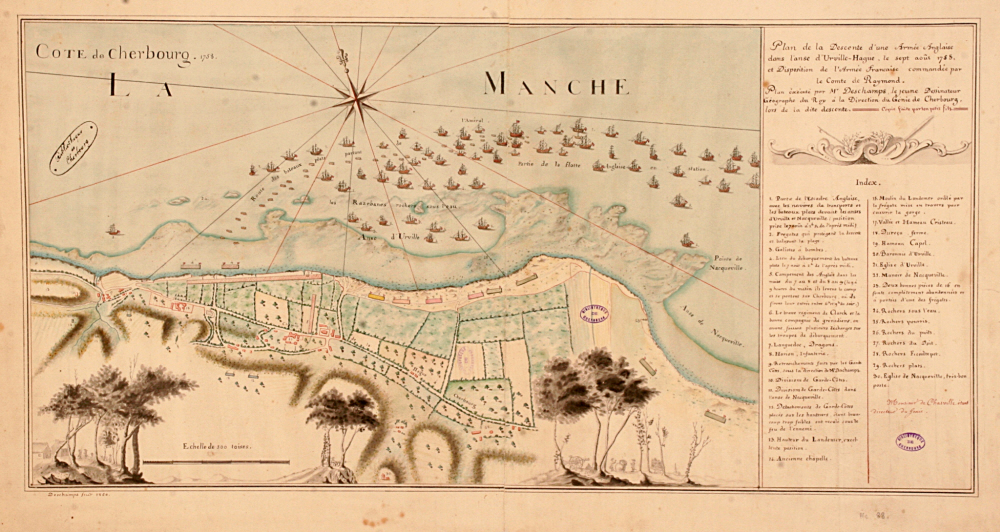
- Contemporary plan of the British landing at Urville, 7 August 1758, by M. Deschamps
Date	7–16 August 1758
Location	Cherbourg, France 49.6425°N 1.6253°W
Result	British victory

Belligerents
Great Britain	France

Commanders and leaders
Thomas Bligh; Richard Howe; General Dury	Comte Pierre de Raymond; Duc d'Harcourt (regional command)

Units involved
Foot Guards; Converged grenadier companies	Clare's Regiment; Regiment of Horion; Regiment of Lorraine; Languedoc dragoons Garde-côte militia

Strength
~10,000 troops 100+ ships	~9,000 (mostly militia and coastguard)

Casualties and losses
c. 20 killed, 30 wounded (British returns); French sources claim far higher	5 killed at the landing; harbour works and forts destroyed; ~37 ships burned; town ransomed (44,000 livres)

The Cherbourg raid took place from 7 to 16 August 1758 during the Seven Years' War, when a British force was landed on the coast of France by the Royal Navy to attack the town of Cherbourg as part of the British government's policy of "descents" on the French coast. Coming ashore west of the town, near Urville-Nacqueville, on 7 August, the British brushed aside the local defences, entered Cherbourg on 8 August, and spent about a week destroying the harbour works and fortifications, sacking the town and the surrounding parishes, before re-embarking without serious interference on 16 August. The raid caused heavy material loss to the town but had little effect on the wider war; the policy of descents was abandoned after the British disaster at the Battle of Saint Cast a month later.

== Background ==
From 1757 the British government used its naval superiority to launch raids against the French coast, intended as a diversion to draw French forces and resources away from Germany, where Britain's allies Prussia, Hanover and Brunswick were under severe pressure. In autumn 1757 a British expedition to Rochefort had captured an offshore island but made no attempt on the town. In 1758 the Duke of Brunswick asked the British to renew the policy as his allied force was being pushed back, and a large naval and military force was assembled in southern England under the direction of George Anson, the First Lord of the Admiralty. In June 1758 the British launched a Raid on St Malo, and following its perceived success a further raid was planned; it was announced that Prince Edward, younger brother of the Prince of Wales, would accompany the expedition.

A British fleet had already appeared off Cherbourg in late June 1758, prompting a general alarm. On 30 June it prepared to land in the anse Sainte-Anne and on the Tourlaville shore, but the wind turned; the attempt was abandoned and the fleet withdrew to revictual, having lost two men. In the weeks that followed the French strengthened the town's defences with fresh redoubts and entrenchments, and at Harcourt's request the ministry of war supplied eighty heavy cannon and five mortars with their munitions. The coast was held by a mixed force of about 9,000 men, the greater part militia and garde-côte (coastguard) companies with some regular battalions, under the immediate command of Comte Pierre de Raymond, with the Duc d'Harcourt, lieutenant-general of Normandy, in overall provincial command. Harcourt had little confidence in Raymond: in a letter of 20 July 1758 to the maréchal de Belle-Isle he complained that the troops "feared him like fire" and that the country placed little trust in him.

== Opposing forces ==
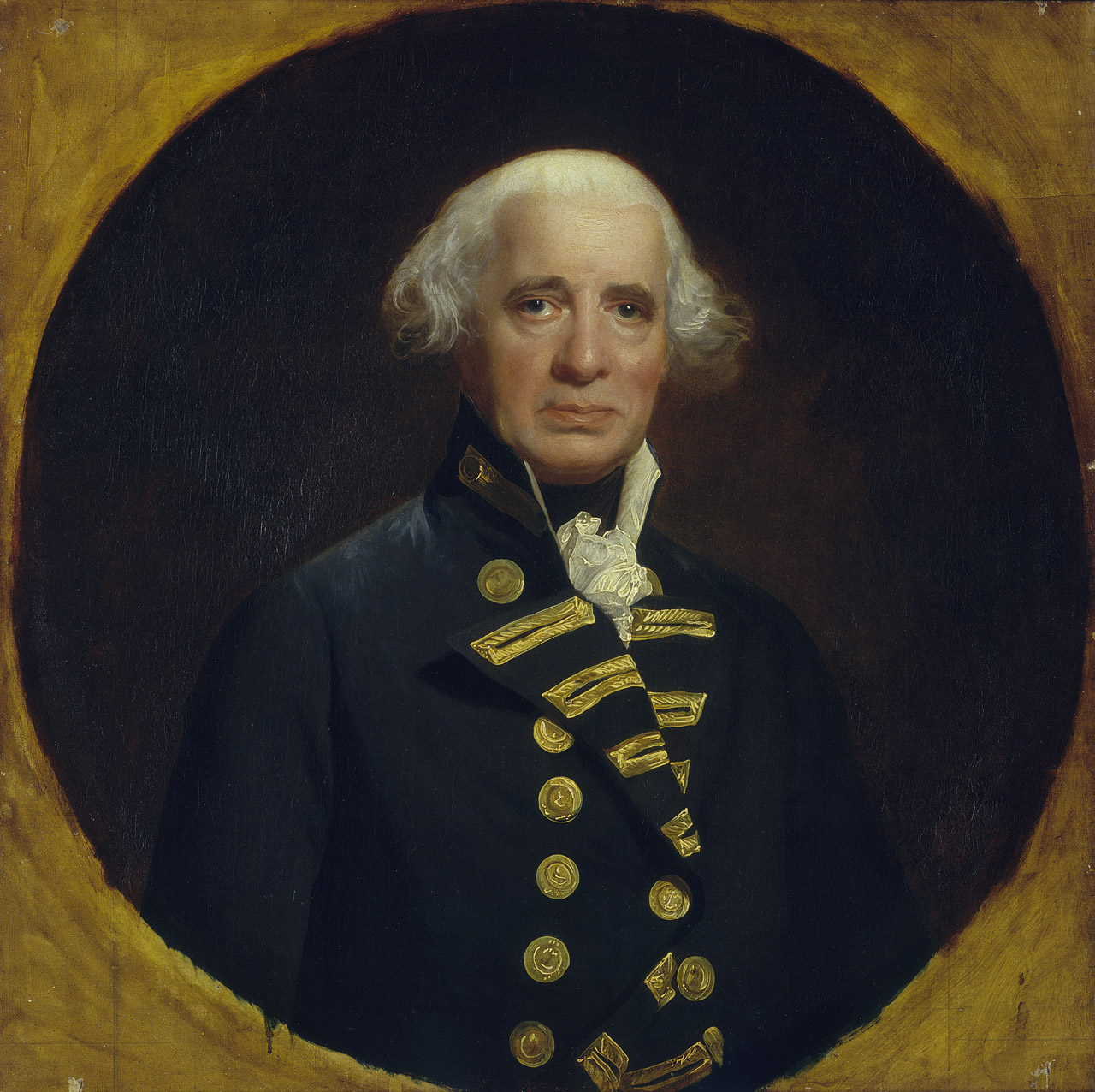
Commodore Richard Howe commanded the fleet.

The British expedition, of more than a hundred sail, was commanded at sea by Commodore Richard Howe and on land by Lieutenant-General Thomas Bligh. It carried some 10,000 troops (contemporary and later estimates vary between about 8,000 and 13,000), organised in twelve battalions including the Guards and the converged grenadier companies. Prince Edward accompanied the fleet, serving for part of the time aboard the frigate Pallas.

The French defence of about 9,000 men was composed largely of garde-côte and militia companies, stiffened by regular battalions of the Irish Clare's Regiment, the Liégeois regiment of Horion, the regiment of Lorraine, and dragoons of the regiment of Languedoc.

== The landing ==
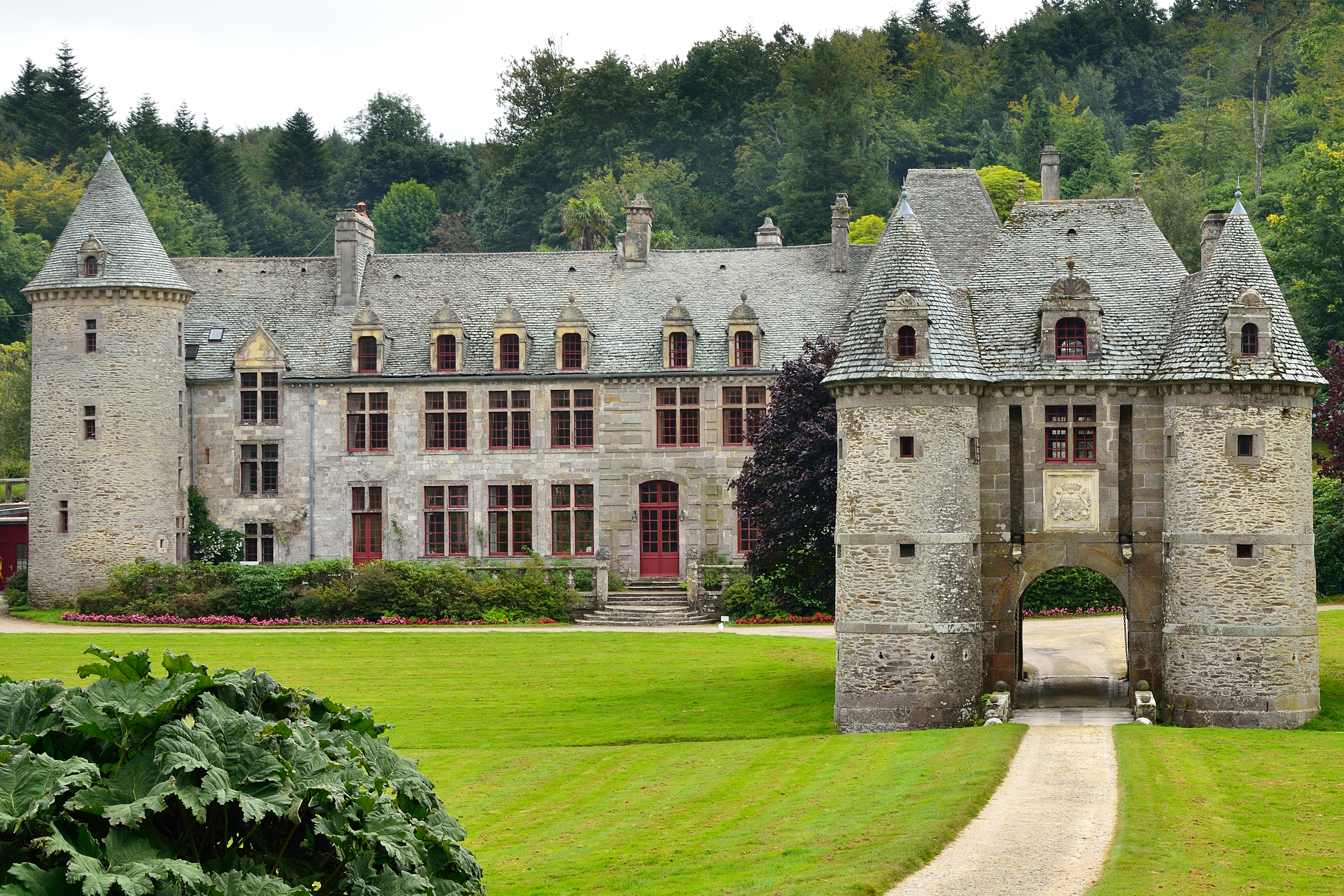
The château de Nacqueville, occupied by British advance parties during the landing. An inscription cut into its façade still records the descent.

The fleet anchored off Cherbourg on 6 August. During the following night bomb-ketches threw some twenty to thirty bombs into the town, which did little damage. Rather than attempt the fortified approaches near Sainte-Anne, the British landed to the west on 7 August, the flat-boats grounding near the hamlet of Christot, opposite Landemer, a stretch of shore left unfortified because the offshore tidal race (the raz d'Urville) was thought to make a landing there impracticable. The infantry came ashore under a heavy covering fire from Howe's frigates, sloops and bomb-ketches, deployed in line close in shore. Some five hundred grenadiers landed from about thirty flat-boats and formed in three columns; French regular troops engaged the British on rising ground broken by hedges and orchards but could not prevent the disembarkation, and by evening the whole of the British infantry was ashore and encamped near Urville.

In a memoir he later addressed to the maréchal de Belle-Isle, Salomon Duby, a Swiss officer serving as captain-general of the royal revenue-farm employees (employés des fermes) at Cherbourg, recorded that he made a stand with about eighty of his men on high ground above the landing place; feigning a larger force by repeated volleys, he brought down one of the English column commanders before he was outflanked and withdrew through the sunken lanes, losing only one man, taken prisoner. On occupying the town the English are said to have called his men la Troupe Brune (the Brown Troop), from the colour of their clothing. The naval captain comte d'Amfréville, disregarding orders, contained one English column for nearly two hours with about thirty men before falling back through the enclosed country.

Judging that the descent could not be resisted with the forces available, Raymond ordered a withdrawal inland to Mont Épinguet and directed that the guns of the coastal forts be spiked, over the objection of Lieutenant-Colonel de Grant of Clare's Regiment, who urged a bayonet attack on the landing force. The French lost five men in contesting the landing, among them a captain of the Irish Clare's Regiment named MacCarthy, an Irish Jacobite in Bourbon service, killed by a bomb-burst and buried in the churchyard of Urville, and a lieutenant of the Horion grenadiers, with about twenty wounded. (Note: The burial of the Clare officer is also recorded in the Urville parish register, dated 9 August 1758.) British advance parties occupied the high ground above Urville and the château de Nacqueville, on the façade of whose manor house an inscription cut at the time still records the event: Les Anglais on dessendu le 7 d'aoust ano 1758 ("The English landed on 7 August 1758").

== Capture of the town ==
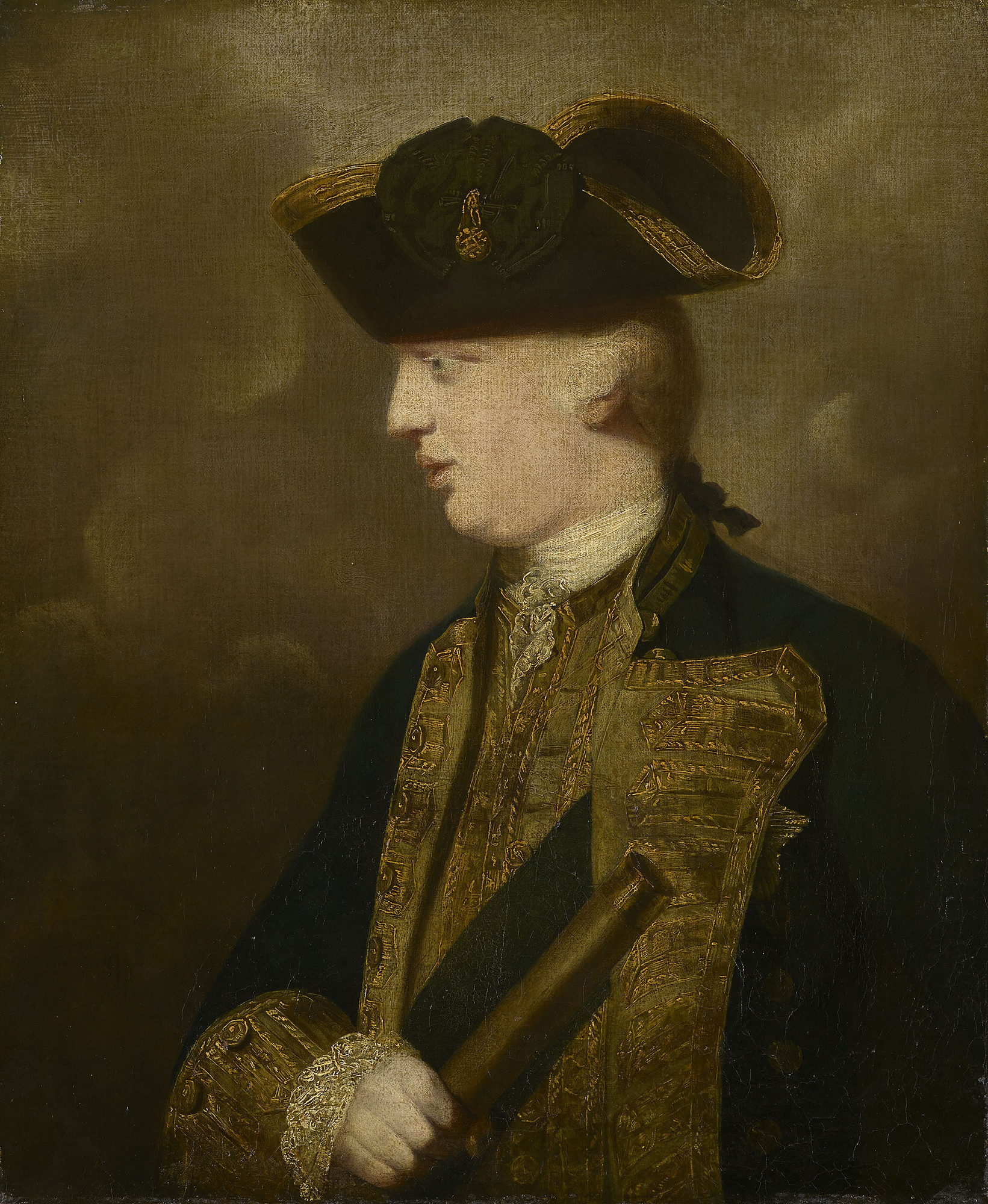
Prince Edward accompanied the expedition and gave a hundred guineas for the poor of Cherbourg.

On 8 August the British advanced on Cherbourg by the low road past Fort de Querqueville, which was found abandoned, and the medieval abbey of Notre-Dame du Vœu. Finding the coastal lines and batteries clear, the vanguard reached the town, which was unfortified on the landward side, and entered it soon after midnight without fighting, the French having retired from both forts and town. The civic authorities went out to General Dury, commander of the vanguard, to ask that the townspeople be spared. Bligh, who made his camp on a hill overlooking the town, issued a proclamation promising to pay cash for provisions and to leave in peace any inhabitants who stayed quietly in their homes, while threatening to burn the houses of those who removed their goods and fled. The young Prince Edward declined to receive the municipal body on the ground that he held no command, but urged the generals to treat the people with moderation and gave a hundred guineas for the poor; he came into the town by day and returned to the fleet each night.

== Destruction of the port ==
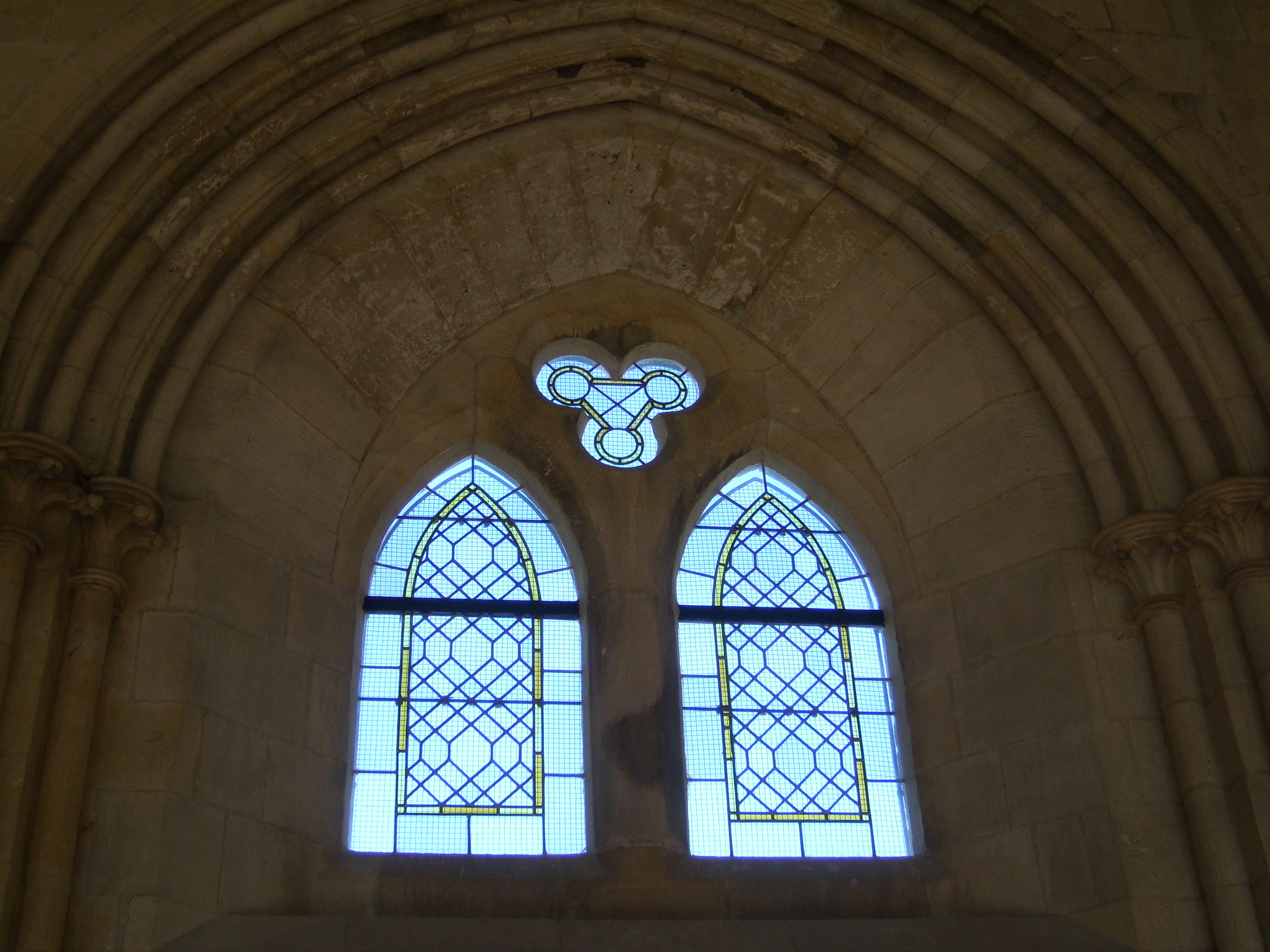
The abbey of Notre-Dame du Vœu, whose five bells were carried off by the British.

The destruction of the harbour was the principal object of the descent. Over several days the British sprang more than fifty mines beneath the jetties, basin and sluice-works and on the forts, a drum being beaten through the town shortly before each explosion to warn the inhabitants; the swing-bridge, sluice and basin gates were wrecked. On 14 August the vessels lying in the basin were burned; French accounts variously count thirty-four merchant ships destroyed, for a loss of about 262,700 livres, or thirty-seven vessels including the privateers Tartare, Aventurier and Conquérant, for some 315,700 livres. The iron guns were disabled and the brass cannon and two mortars carried off on a Danish merchant ship, the Prospert. The British artillery commander, Desaguliers, had the abbey's five bells carried off despite the pleas of the prior, and would have taken those of the town church too but for the entreaties of the curé Pâris, who saved all but one; the account of the abbey canon Besse confirms that the great bells were taken by Bligh's order. The captured guns were afterwards shipped to Britain.

== Sack of the town and countryside ==
Despite the proclamation, the town and its suburbs were plundered from the first night, and the surrounding parishes were stripped of livestock, furniture and provisions. French accounts record that churches were desecrated and that soldiers looting the villages beat the country people; the abbey canon Besse and other writers state that women were assaulted and raped. An archidiaconal visitation of the Cotentin parishes in 1761 recorded the damage: at Tonneville, Hainneville, Équeurdreville, Nouainville and Octeville the churches had been pillaged and their ornaments and sacred vessels carried off, and at Équeurdreville the parish registers themselves were stolen. Bligh had two of his own soldiers hanged for looting, but without ordering restitution.

The scale of the losses is recorded in nearly four hundred individual declarations of loss preserved in the town archives; the damage suffered by the inhabitants was reckoned at more than 800,000 livres, in a town of fewer than 10,000 people. Much of the plunder, however, was the work of local people exploiting the disorder rather than of the British alone: a prosecution opened by the king's prosecutor at Cherbourg, prompted by an ecclesiastical monitory of July 1759, gathered 164 depositions in 1759–60 describing inhabitants who stripped abandoned houses and carried off livestock, furniture and money, both during the occupation and from the English camp at Octeville after the army had withdrawn. British discipline was poor: men who broke into wine stores caused drunkenness that delayed the demolition of the works, and Bligh was afterwards blamed for failing to control his troops. British military returns recorded only about 20 killed and 30 wounded during the whole enterprise; French accounts, by contrast, put the total British loss, including prisoners and deserters, at over seven hundred, most of them marauders killed in the countryside by inhabitants defending their own property, since no troops came to their aid.

The town was compelled to ransom itself for 44,000 livres, calculated as about a year's royal dues; unable to pay the whole at once, it gave 22,000 and surrendered two militia officers, Robert Postel and Gratien Gauvain, as hostages for the remainder, while the town's plate-glass manufactory and glassworks were separately assessed at 15,000 and 3,000 livres.

== Withdrawal ==
On 16 August the British marched down to the beach near Fort Galet and re-embarked, having stayed a week; the fleet sailed for Britain on 18 August. On leaving, they left behind quantities of salt meat and biscuit and gave 4,200 livres for the town's poor families. French accounts noted that it was 308 years, almost to the day, since the English had last held Cherbourg, at the end of the Hundred Years' War in 1450. French regular troops under the Duc de Luxembourg, governor of Normandy, re-entered the wrecked town the same evening, wading the ruined bridge at low tide in view of the fleet, no attempt having been made to fall on the British during their unhurried re-embarkation; a thanksgiving Mass was sung on 18 August once the ships had gone. The descent was reckoned to have cost the French state some two and a half million livres, besides losses to the townspeople the town estimated at over 700,000 livres and the ruin of many families in the neighbouring parishes.

== Aftermath ==
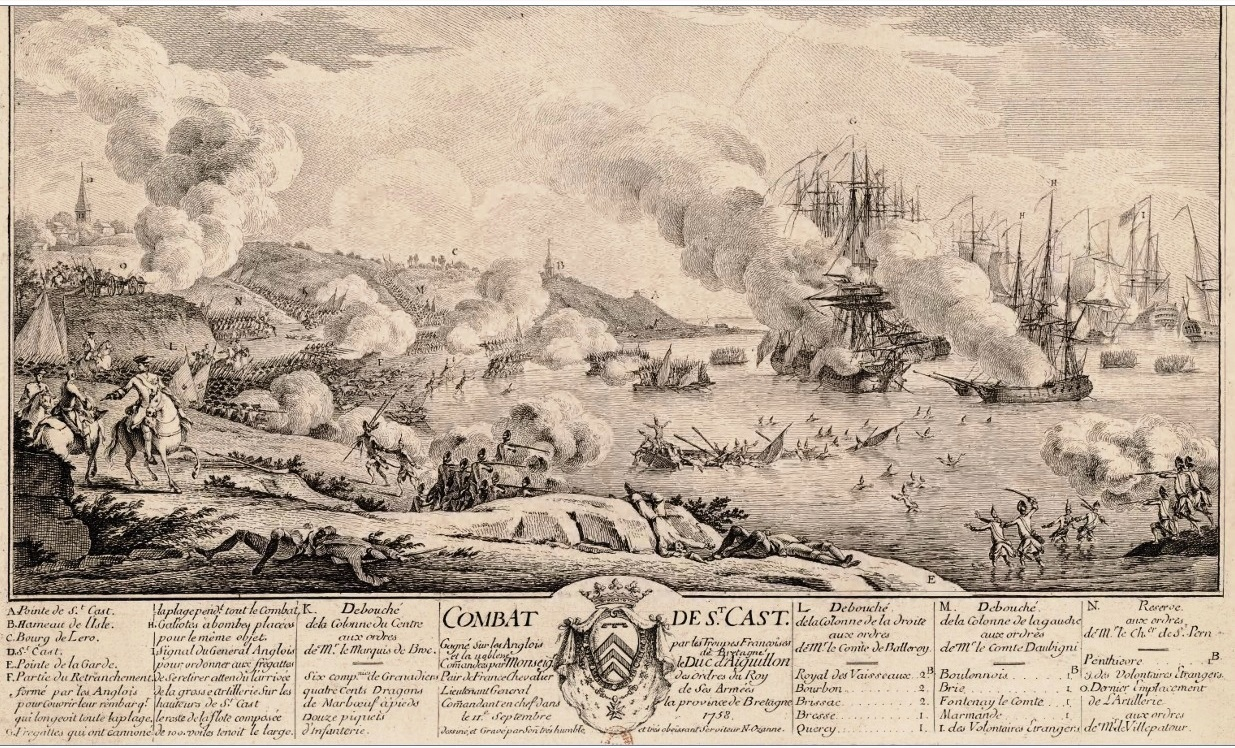
The British disaster at the Battle of Saint Cast (11 September 1758) ended the policy of "descents".

News of the expedition boosted morale in Britain, and the captured cannon were paraded in London; newspapers observed that it was the first successful landing of any significant size since the Hundred Years' War. The scheme had been a favourite project of William Pitt, who pressed for further raids. In September 1758 Bligh attempted St Malo, but the weather allowed him to land only part of his force, which was quickly confronted by superior French numbers; withdrawing to his ships, he suffered heavy losses at the Battle of Saint Cast. This brought an end to the policy of "descents", as the British committed more troops to Germany rather than risk another failure. Despite the reverse at Saint-Cast, the raids had weakened French morale and shown that even parts of Metropolitan France were vulnerable to British naval power; in response France planned a major invasion of Britain, which had to be abandoned after French naval defeats.

The two hostages, Postel and Gauvain, were held in England for a year, at Petersfield, and were returned to Cherbourg on 15 August 1759 once the town had paid off the outstanding bond; a receipt signed by Bligh survives among the town records. The town, its port and much of its trade ruined, petitioned the king for relief through 1759, and the state eventually reimbursed some 56,538 livres towards the ransom and associated costs. The conduct of the Comte de Raymond, who had spiked his own guns and abandoned the town almost without a fight, was widely condemned; the memoirist Dumouriez, who served in the Cotentin at the time, wrote that "the English took Cherbourg through the cowardly ineptitude of a maréchal-de-camp named Raymond". Raymond defended his conduct in a justificatory memoir and, through court connections including the favour of Madame de Pompadour, escaped censure; he was nonetheless recalled from his command by the king in late September 1758 and was afterwards given the command of Angoulême. Le Sauvage, the major of Cherbourg who had remained in the town throughout the occupation, was briefly detained as a suspect after obtaining an English safeguard for a property he owned at Réville, but his conduct was judged irreproachable and he was restored.

== Sources and historiography ==
The outline of the campaign is well attested in British military and naval histories, notably those of J. W. Fortescue and William Laird Clowes, which draw on contemporary journals of the expedition. The events as seen from the French coast are recorded in the older histories of Cherbourg by Retau-Dufresne (1760) and Voisin La Hougue (continued by Vérusmor, 1835), in Gabriel Vanel's Étude sur la prise de Cherbourg en 1758 (1906), in modern local histories such as Maurice Lecœur's Cherbourg au fil du temps (2002), and in detailed studies published by the Société nationale académique de Cherbourg, in particular those of Le Roux (1898) and Houivet (1905). Much of the contemporary official correspondence, together with several first-hand accounts (a letter from an inhabitant of Cherbourg, the memoir of the employés officer Salomon Duby, and letters of the officers d'Amfréville and Besse), was printed by Célestin Hippeau from the archives of the ducs d'Harcourt. The account of the plunder of the surrounding country, and the much higher French casualty claims, derive from these French sources and are best treated as reported by them; the British and French figures for casualties in particular do not agree.

== See also ==
- Naval Descents
- Raid on St Malo
- Battle of Saint Cast

== Bibliography ==
- Anderson, Fred. Crucible of War: The Seven Years' War and the Fate of Empire in British North America, 1754–1766. Faber and Faber, 2001.
- Clowes, W. Laird. The Royal Navy: A History from the Earliest Times to the Present, vol. III. Sampson Low, Marston and Company, 1898.
- Fortescue, J. W. A History of the British Army, vol. II. Macmillan, 1899.
- Hippeau, Célestin. Le gouvernement de Normandie au XVIIe et au XVIIIe siècle d'après la correspondance des ducs d'Harcourt. Caen: A. Goujon, 1863–1869. ("Descente des Anglais à Cherbourg".)
- Lecœur, Maurice. Cherbourg au fil du temps. Cherbourg: Isoète, 2002.
- Middleton, Richard. The Bells of Victory: The Pitt–Newcastle Ministry and the Conduct of the Seven Years' War, 1757–1762. Cambridge University Press, 1985.
- Rodger, N. A. M. The Command of the Ocean: A Naval History of Britain, 1649–1815. Penguin Books, 2006.
- Simms, Brendan. Three Victories and a Defeat: The Rise and Fall of the First British Empire. Penguin Books, 2008.
- Voisin La Hougue, continued by Vérusmor. Histoire de la ville de Cherbourg. Cherbourg: impr. Boulanger, 1835.
