= Urville-Nacqueville =

Former commune in Normandy, France

- Part of La Hague
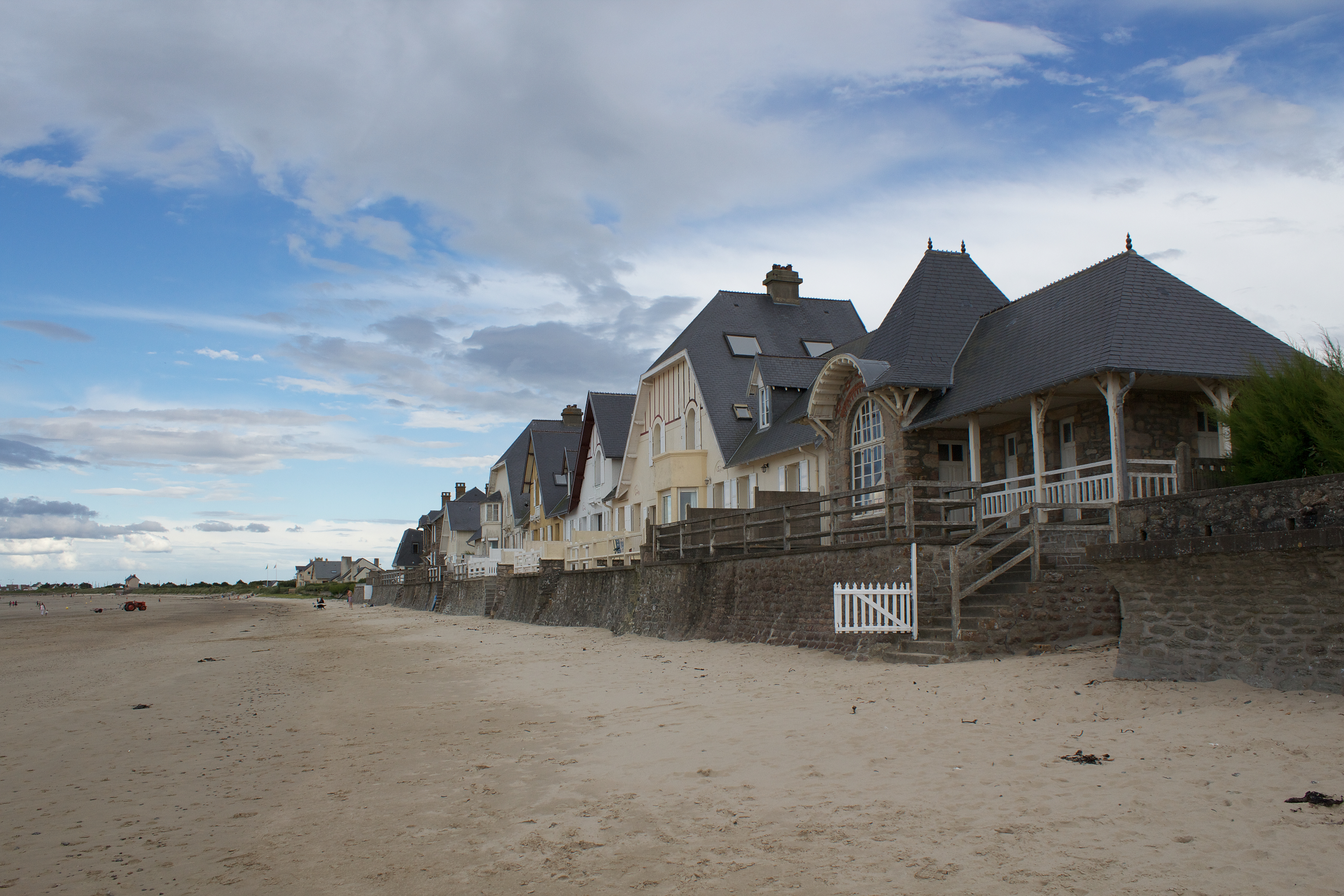
- Houses along the beach
- Location of Urville-Nacqueville
- Location within France Location within Normandy
- Coordinates: 49°40′29″N 1°44′15″W
- Country: France
- Region: Normandy
- Department: Manche
- Arrondissement: Cherbourg
- Canton: La Hague
- Commune: La Hague
- Area^{1}: 11.58 km^{2} (4.47 sq mi)
- Elevation: 38 m (125 ft)
- Highest elevation: 148 m (486 ft)
- Lowest elevation: 0 m (0 ft)
- Population (2022): 1,948
  - Density: 168.2/km^{2} (435.7/sq mi)
- Time zone: UTC+01:00 (CET)
  - Summer (DST): UTC+02:00 (CEST)
- Postal code: 50460
- ^{1} French Land Register data, which excludes lakes, ponds, glaciers > 1 km^{2} (0.386 sq mi or 247 acres) and river estuaries.

Urville-Nacqueville (French pronunciation: [yʁvil nakvil]) is a former commune in the Manche department in Normandy in north-western France. It was created on 1 January 1964 by the merger of two neighbouring communes, Urville-Hague to the west and Nacqueville to the east, and on 1 January 2017 was itself absorbed into the new commune of La Hague, within which it holds the status of commune déléguée. Its inhabitants are known as Urvillo-Nacquevillais, and the commune had 1,948 inhabitants in 2022.

The commune lies on the north coast of the Cotentin peninsula at the entrance to La Hague. It combines a long sandy beach, a bathing and windsurfing resort since the early 20th century, with an inland farming hinterland of scattered hamlets, and is backed to the south by a wooded slope rising to the schist plateau of La Hague.

Its foreshore holds a notable Iron Age cross-Channel trading settlement, one of the most important protohistoric coastal sites in Normandy, and its beach saw the British landing that opened the 1758 raid on Cherbourg. The two former villages preserve a 16th-century château and a 14th-century manor, both listed monuments, while a single modern parish church replaced the two medieval churches destroyed in 1944.

== Geography ==
=== Setting and relief ===
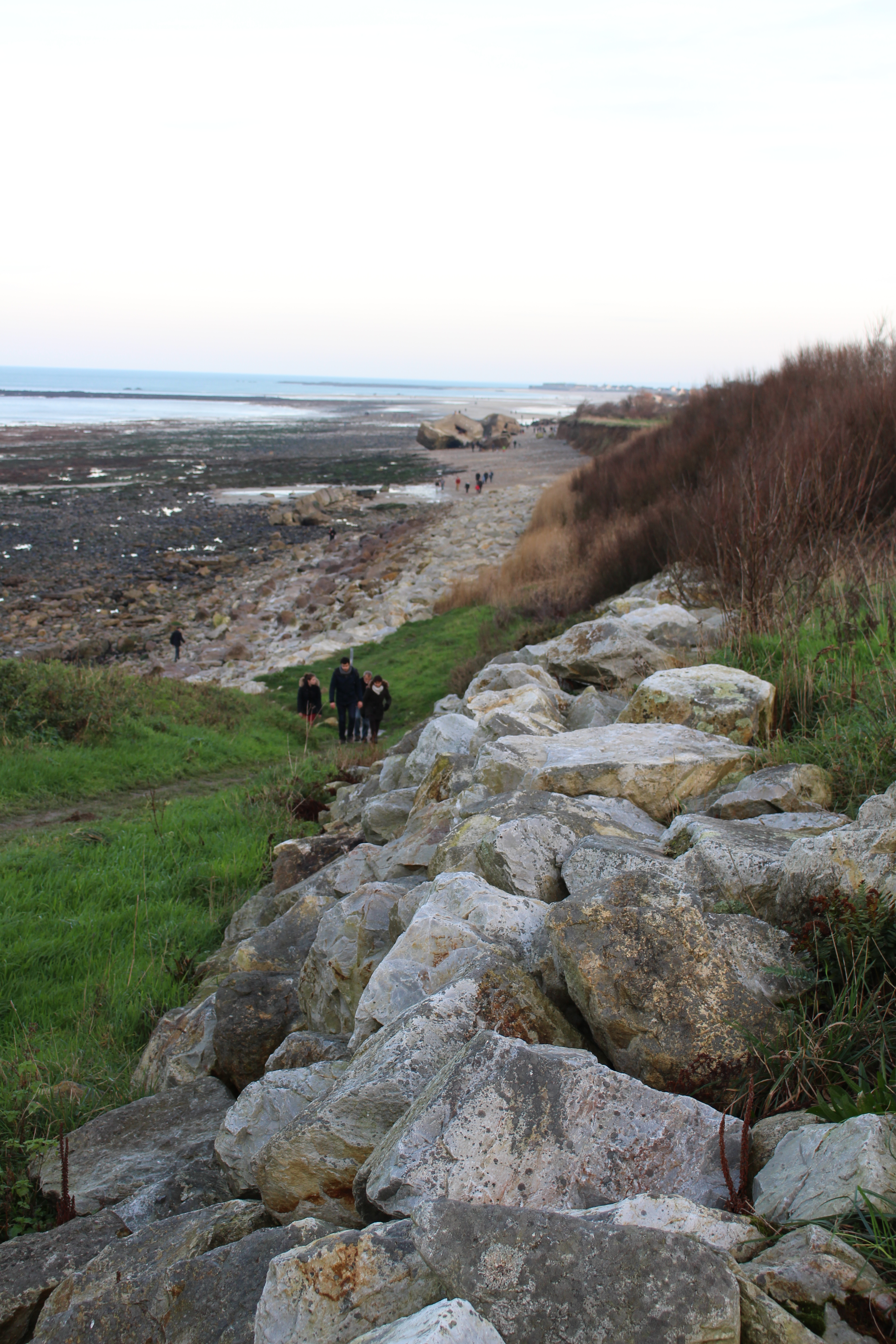
The coast at Landemer, at the western edge of the commune

Urville-Nacqueville occupies the northern shore of the Cotentin, in the La Hague country north-west of Cherbourg and east of the cliffs that mark the tip of the peninsula. At the 2017 merger its neighbouring communes were Branville-Hague, Cherbourg-en-Cotentin, Gréville-Hague, Querqueville and Sainte-Croix-Hague. The territory covers 11.58 square kilometres (4.47 sq mi) and rises from sea level in the north to 148 metres (486 ft) on the plateau to the south. A long sandy beach backed by dunes runs between rocky promontories carrying the coastal forts, and rises westward into the cliffs of Landemer; a submerged forest, associated with the Raz de Bannes offshore, lies in the intertidal zone.

=== Hydrography and localities ===
Several short streams descend through wooded valleys from the plateau to the sea, among them the Hubiland, the Biale with its tributary the Mézières, and the Castelets, which forms part of the eastern boundary and waters the park of the château de Nacqueville; the Caudar, which once powered the mills of Dur-Écu, rises within the commune. The two former villages stand at the foot of the coastal slope, while numerous hamlets are dispersed across the plateau and the valleys behind, including Landemer, Christo (Cristot), Eudal, La Rivière, Nacqueville-Haut and the Hameau-Nicolle.

== Toponymy ==
Both names are of the -ville type, in the old sense of "rural estate" (villa), preceded, as is most common, by the name of an owner. Urville is attested as Urvilla about 1160 to 1163 and contains, like the other places of the name, a Germanic personal name (Uro); an Old Norse personal name Ýr(r) has also been proposed. Nacqueville (Nakevilla, Nachevilla, 1148) derives from the Old Norse personal name Hnakki, a Scandinavian byname that probably meant "the one with a long or broad neck". The dense survival of Scandinavian micro-toponyms reflects the Norse settlement of the coast: Landemer (Old Norse landamerki, "landmark"), Christo for Cristot (a -tot name), Eudal (formerly Usdal, 1256, from dalr, "valley") and Les Houllegattes (from holr, "hollow", and gata, "way", a sunken lane).

== History ==
=== Iron Age port and cemetery ===
The foreshore at Urville-Nacqueville ("Les Dunes"), at the entrance to La Hague, is the site of a coastal settlement and cemetery of the late Iron Age (La Tène C2 to D1, roughly the late 2nd and early 1st centuries BC). Known since the late 19th century and excavated on the beach by the archaeologist Anthony Lefort and collaborators from 2009 onward, it was a small but prosperous port and craft community. Its inhabitants farmed and raised stock, but drew above all on the sea: fishing (attested by thousands of discarded limpet shells, net-weights, and fish and crustacean bones), the exploitation of a stranded whale, salt-making shown by briquetage, and the working of imported Kimmeridge shale into bracelets. An exceptional quantity of Italic and other wine amphorae, gold coinage from central Gaul, and buildings of insular roundhouse type point to close and regular exchange across the English Channel with southern Britain, the site lying almost due south of the contemporary port of Hengistbury Head. The associated necropolis, dated to about the early 1st century BC, was recorded in the campaigns published in 2015 as 94 graves (64 inhumations, 28 cremations and 2 mixed structures) yielding a minimum of 114 individuals, with an unusually high proportion of infant burials. Some adults were buried in a crouched position comparable to the "Durotrigian" rite of Dorset, and ancient DNA from three of these men was analysed in a 2022 archaeogenomic study, which found the group genetically close to Iron Age Britain and could not rule out a southern-English origin for the three.

Coastal-erosion survey has identified a second occupation area at Les Clos Bouillons, at Landemer about 2 kilometres (1.2 mi) west of the principal settlement, where retreating cliffs have exposed ditches, postholes and the remains of a probable circular building together with imported Kimmeridge shale and an amphora fragment; the finds suggest that Iron Age occupation extended along a broader stretch of the coast and may have begun earlier than the main site, though the identification of a possible small monument there remains uncertain. The archaeology is continually revealed, and destroyed, by rapid coastal erosion, the shoreline in this sector having retreated by tens of metres over the 20th century. During sand extraction on the beach around 1820, for the building of Cherbourg's naval arsenals, a deposit of Gaulish (Armorican) coins was found, described in 19th-century accounts as several hundred base-silver pieces.

=== Roman period ===
A Roman presence is suggested at Dur-Écu, west of the village, where a Roman millstone and hearth bricks were found in the early 19th century and two reused Roman columns support the manor kitchen chimney; aerial and surface evidence has been interpreted as a possible Roman rural or maritime establishment, though no villa has been securely excavated.

=== Middle Ages ===
The two villages formed separate parishes with distinct ecclesiastical ties. The church of Saint-Martin at Urville was given in 1163 to the priory of Vauville, a dependency of the abbey of Cerisy, by Richard de Bohon, bishop of Coutances, who thereafter held the right of presentation; the church of Saint-Laurent at Nacqueville was attached to the abbey of Notre-Dame du Vœu at Cherbourg. Local tradition holds that Clair of Normandy (845–884), a Benedictine monk, landed here from England and lived as a hermit; the Chapelle Saint-Clair, above the hamlet of La Rivière, is documented from the 13th century and preserves his name, and an annual fair, the foire de la Saint-Clair, was held at Nacqueville on 18 July. The territory was divided among several fiefs: the seigneurie of Nacqueville, formed from the union of the fiefs of Fourneville and Les Marets (the latter long held by the Carbonnel family), was dependent on the barony of Bricquebec; the fief of Urville was held of the barony of Orglandes; and the fortified manor of Dur-Écu, guarding the old road from Cherbourg into La Hague, was held of the fief of Durescu at Gatteville, itself dependent on the barony of Olonde.

=== Ancien Régime ===
English forces landed on the coast more than once in the 16th century: at Rases-Bannes in Urville in 1520, and at Landemer in 1522, pillaging the area. A 1567 roll of the ban et arrière-ban of the vicomté de Valognes records Jehan Heuzey as lord of Urville, Gréville and Dur-Écu, the fief of Urville being worth a quarter fief de haubert. Around 1600 Dur-Écu passed to Thomas Lesdos, an advocate at the vicomté de Valognes and bailli of the high justice of the abbey of the Vœu, a partisan of Henry IV who helped keep Cherbourg loyal to the crown during the League; he died in 1632. Beyond its noble character, Dur-Écu was the centre of a working agricultural estate: a description of about 1708 records, besides the dwelling with its cellars and attics, a cider press, barns and stables, orchards, pasture, coppice woodland and arable land.

On 7 August 1758, during the Seven Years' War, a British expeditionary force came ashore in the bay between Urville and Querqueville, then marched on Cherbourg, storming the town and destroying its harbour. The château de Nacqueville was occupied by the invaders, and an inscription cut into the façade of its main range still records the event: Les Anglais on dessendu le 7 d'aoust ano 1758 ("The English landed on 7 August 1758"). During the Revolution, in 1794, the château's owner Jean-Baptiste Barbout de Querqueville sheltered royalists seeking to emigrate to England; he was arrested and brought before the conventionnel Le Carpentier, in whose presence he died.

=== 19th century ===
In 1826 Hippolyte Clérel de Tocqueville, elder brother of the writer Alexis de Tocqueville, inherited the château de Nacqueville through his wife Émilie Érard de Belisle de Saint-Rémy; he restored it and, in the 1830s, laid out its celebrated English-style park, whose streams were dammed to form ponds, cascades and fountains and whose planting and framed views linked the château to the sea. Urville became a fashionable seaside resort at the turn of the 20th century, the beach at Nacqueville being a favourite of the people of Cherbourg. The coast was also fortified with two forts and a battery, later incorporated into the German Atlantic Wall.

=== Seaside resort ===
The transformation of the shore into a resort was a planned speculation. From about 1906 Alexandre Fontanes, a native of Cherbourg who became director of the Théâtre du Châtelet, acquired coastal land and, with the architect René Levavasseur, developed the "Village Normand", a neo-Norman ensemble of chalets and holiday houses built in the years around 1909 to 1911, alongside timber-framed villas along the beach. The extension of the Cherbourg tramway to Urville, with its own station, made the beach easily accessible from the town and underpinned the growth of bathing, hotels and seasonal residence. In the 1920s the family of the writer Boris Vian holidayed at Landemer, in the Hubiland valley, which he later evoked in his novel L'Arrache-cœur.

=== Second World War and after ===
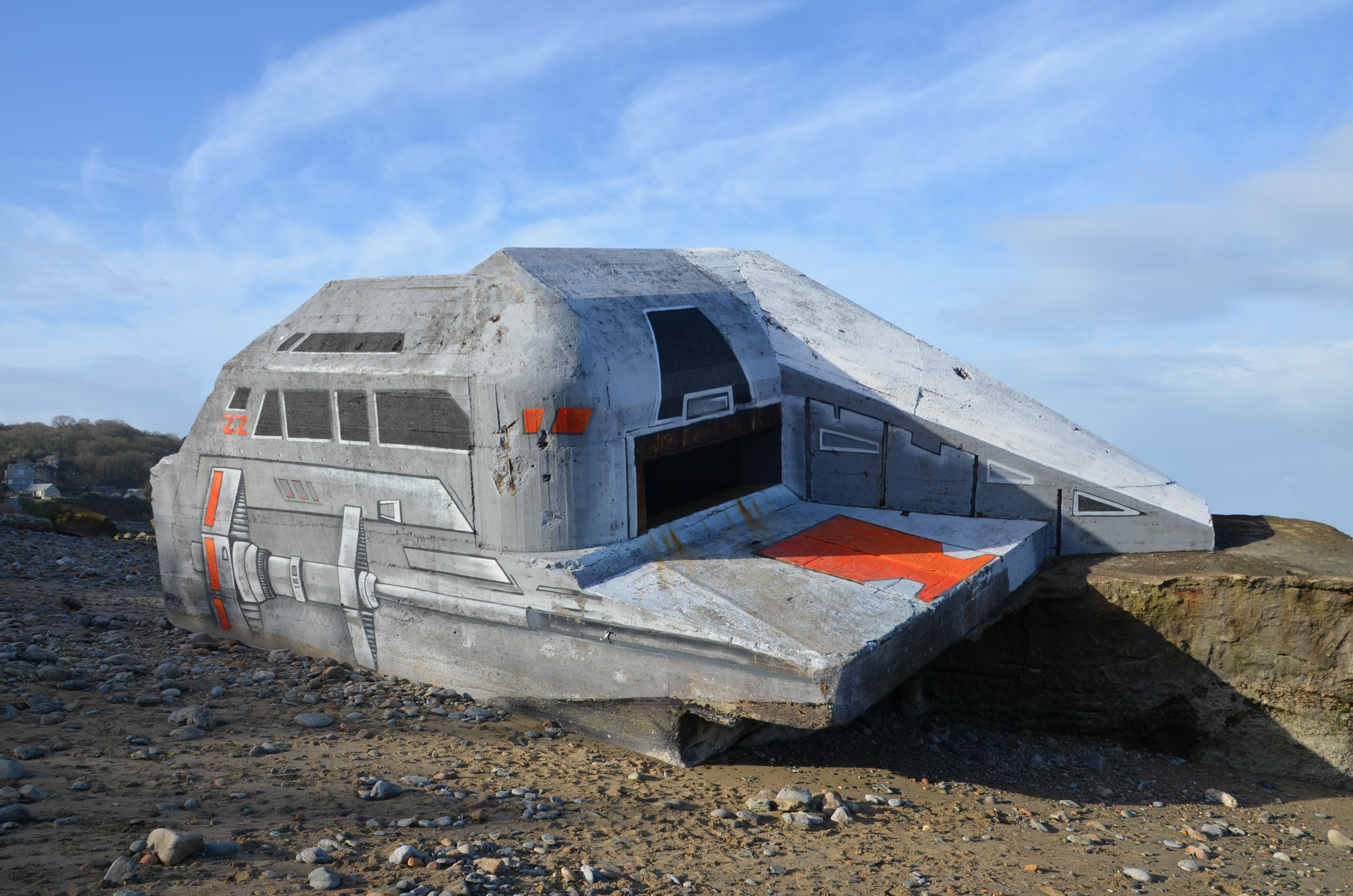
Remains of an Atlantic Wall blockhouse on the beach

The heights above Nacqueville carried German radar and listening stations, which were targeted by Allied air attack. On 2 June 1944 a British aerial bombardment killed 19 civilians and wounded 11, and around the same time the German army dynamited the hilltop church of Nacqueville; the church of Urville-Hague later collapsed as American tanks passed. The area was liberated on 28 June, and the Hameau-Nicolle the following day, by the 47th Infantry Regiment of the United States Army, and Urville-Nacqueville holds the Croix de guerre 1939–1945. The château des Marets was destroyed in 1944, and the manoir de Dur-Écu gutted by fire; the "Village Normand" and many villas at Landemer were also lost. After the liberation the park of the château de Nacqueville was used as a prisoner-of-war camp for German soldiers, recorded by the International Committee of the Red Cross as camp CCPWE No. 10, where a re-education scheme known as the "Sunflower Project" was run in 1945; the very high prisoner numbers given in some local accounts await confirmation from military records. A United States military base stood at Nacqueville from about 1950 to 1960, and American servicemen founded a local baseball club. Urville-Hague and Nacqueville merged to form Urville-Nacqueville on 1 January 1964, and the commune was in turn absorbed into La Hague in 2017.

== Population ==
Historical population

Year	Pop.	±% p.a.
1793	440	—
1821	503	+0.48%
1851	466	−0.25%
1881	312	−1.33%
1911	323	+0.12%
1936	294	−0.38%
1962	382	+1.01%
1968	867	+14.64%

Year	Pop.	±% p.a.
1975	941	+1.18%
1982	1,245	+4.08%
1990	2,109	+6.81%
1999	2,227	+0.61%
2006	2,245	+0.12%
2013	2,154	−0.59%
2022	1,948	−1.11%

Population of Urville-Hague up to 1962, then of the merged commune of Urville-Nacqueville.
Source: EHESS and INSEE

== Economy and culture ==
Long a community of farmers and fishermen, whose distinctive occupational speech was the subject of a study of the "language of the fishermen of Urville-Hague", the commune turned in the 20th century towards seaside tourism; its wind-exposed beach is a well-known windsurfing and funboard venue. The children's publisher Éditions Motus, founded in 1988, is based at Landemer, and the Comité Gilles de Gouberville, a local history society, has its seat at the manoir de Dur-Écu.

== Main sights ==
=== Château de Nacqueville ===
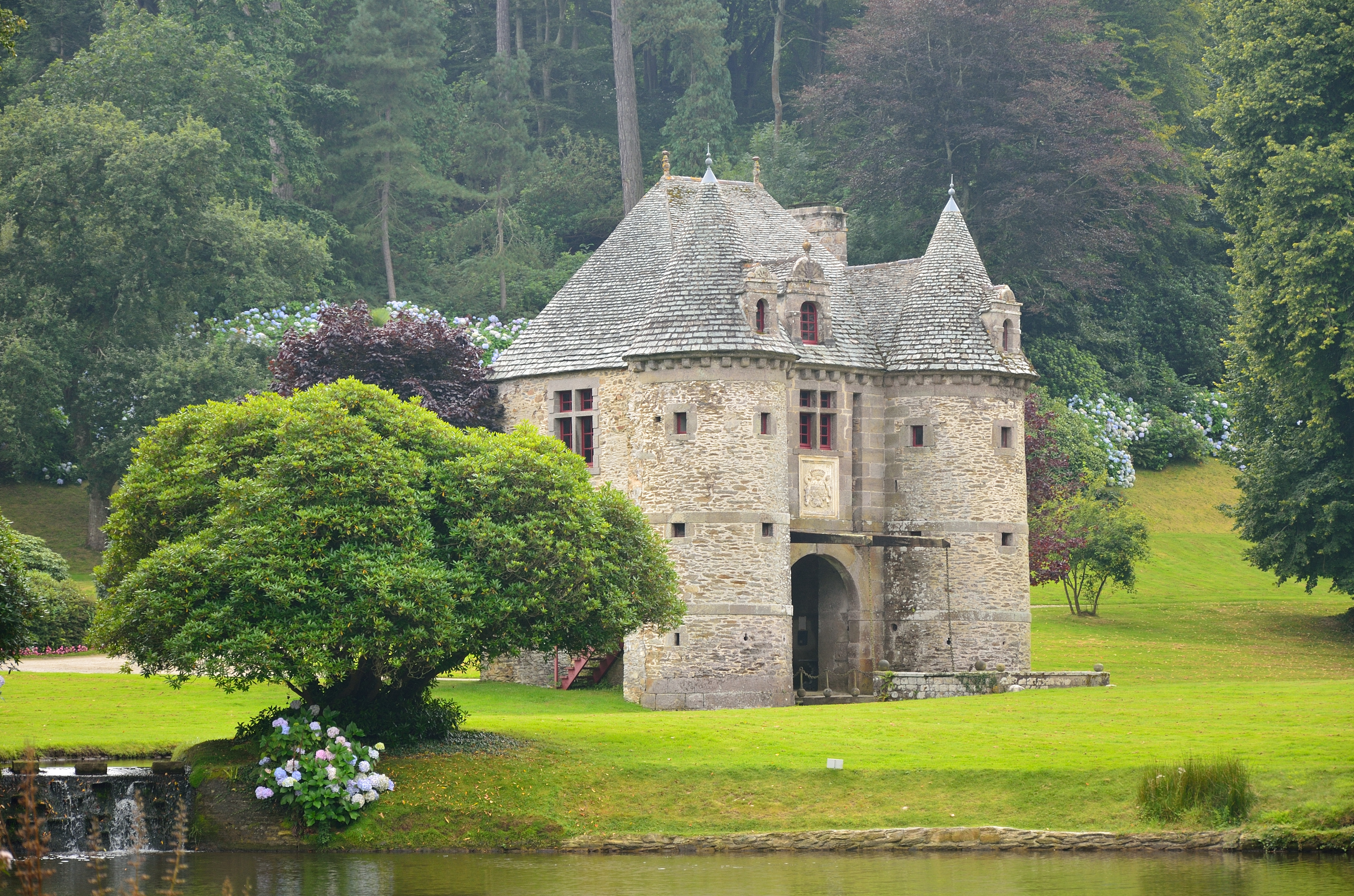
The château de Nacqueville and its park, a monument historique and Jardin remarquable

The château de Nacqueville, also called the château de Fourneville, stands in a wooded valley to the south-east of the village, partly on the neighbouring commune of Querqueville. The seigneurie arose from the union of two adjoining fiefs, Fourneville and Les Marets, held respectively by the Grimouville and Saint-Gilles families; the present Renaissance manor was built through the 16th century by three generations of the Grimouville family and completed by Pierre de Grimouville and his wife Guillemette d'Argouges. In 1689 Bernardin Mangon des Marest acquired the château and razed its defensive enceinte the following year, keeping only the gatehouse. Hippolyte de Tocqueville restored it after 1826 and created the park; on his death in 1877 it passed to the engineer Hildevert Hersent, and it remains with his descendants, the d'Harcourt family. Of the medieval castle there survives the gatehouse, flanked by two round pepper-pot towers and pierced by a mullioned window over the grooves of the former drawbridge, beneath which the Tocqueville arms are carved. The English-style park, laid out in the 1830s and crossed by the Castelets stream, extends over some 35 hectares of ponds, cascades and exotic planting, including palms and gunneras. The drawbridge gate and its two towers were listed as a monument historique by decree of 16 May 1944, and the château's façades and roofs together with the park by decree of 20 November 1992; the domain has been a site classé since 1969 and has held the Jardin remarquable label since 2020. Only the park is normally open to visitors; in 1922 the silent film La Dame de Monsoreau by René Le Somptier was partly shot at the château.

=== Manoir de Dur-Écu ===
The Manoir de Dur-Écu lies at the foot of a wooded hill overlooking the sea, about 1.5 kilometres (0.93 mi) west of the village, on the line of the old royal road from Cherbourg into La Hague. A fortified dwelling of the 14th century, it was rebuilt in the 16th century after the Hundred Years' War on older foundations. Among its lords were Jehan Heuzey in the later 16th century, Thomas Lesdos around 1600, and Louis II de Grimouville (died 1685); it passed afterwards through the Mangon, Lesourd and Folliot d'Urville families, and in 1808 Jean-Louis Le Moigne built three watermills on the Caudar stream and a windmill on the hill. The manor comprises a narrow logis between two round pepper-pot towers, retaining loopholes and other defensive features, together with a machicolated keep and a massive round dovecote of about 2,000 nesting holes. The present broad keep was rebuilt after 1944 by the René-Bazin family, who restored the manor over some fifty years after it was gutted by fire during the bombardments of June 1944. The name Dur-Écu ("hard shield") is popularly linked to a legend of William the Conqueror sheltering behind the shield of a knight. The façades and roofs of the manor and dovecote were listed as a monument historique by decree of 30 December 1982, and the site has been classified since 1965; the former mills now serve as holiday cottages.

=== Parish church ===
Each of the two former communes had its own church until 1944. The neo-Gothic church of Nacqueville, built in 1904 by the château owner Hildevert Hersent on the hill beside a radar station, was dynamited by the German army in early June 1944; the church of Urville-Hague (1812, dedicated to Saint Martin) collapsed as American tanks passed, leaving only its porch-tower with a bas-relief of the Charity of Saint Martin. A single church for the two merged parishes was built in 1958 to 1961 to designs by the architect François Champart (1912–1997), who sought to echo, in modern materials of exposed stone and schist roofing, the squat forms of the old churches of La Hague; the first Mass was celebrated on 1 November 1960 and the church consecrated on 6 August 1961. Its stained glass (1960), in the dalle de verre technique, is the work of the master glazier Henri Martin-Granel: the sanctuary windows depict the patrons of the united parish, the Virgin with the Child, Saint Laurence of Nacqueville and Saint Martin of Urville, while the nave carries a Tree of Jesse and the early-Christian ichthus fish. The church also holds a statue of the Virgin (1962) by Ferdinand Parpan, a crucifix by François-Armand Fréret from the old church of Urville, a 17th-century tabernacle door showing the Sacrifice of Isaac, and a Spanish eagle lectern; the font of the old church of Urville stands in a detached baptistery on the parvis.

=== Chapels and other monuments ===
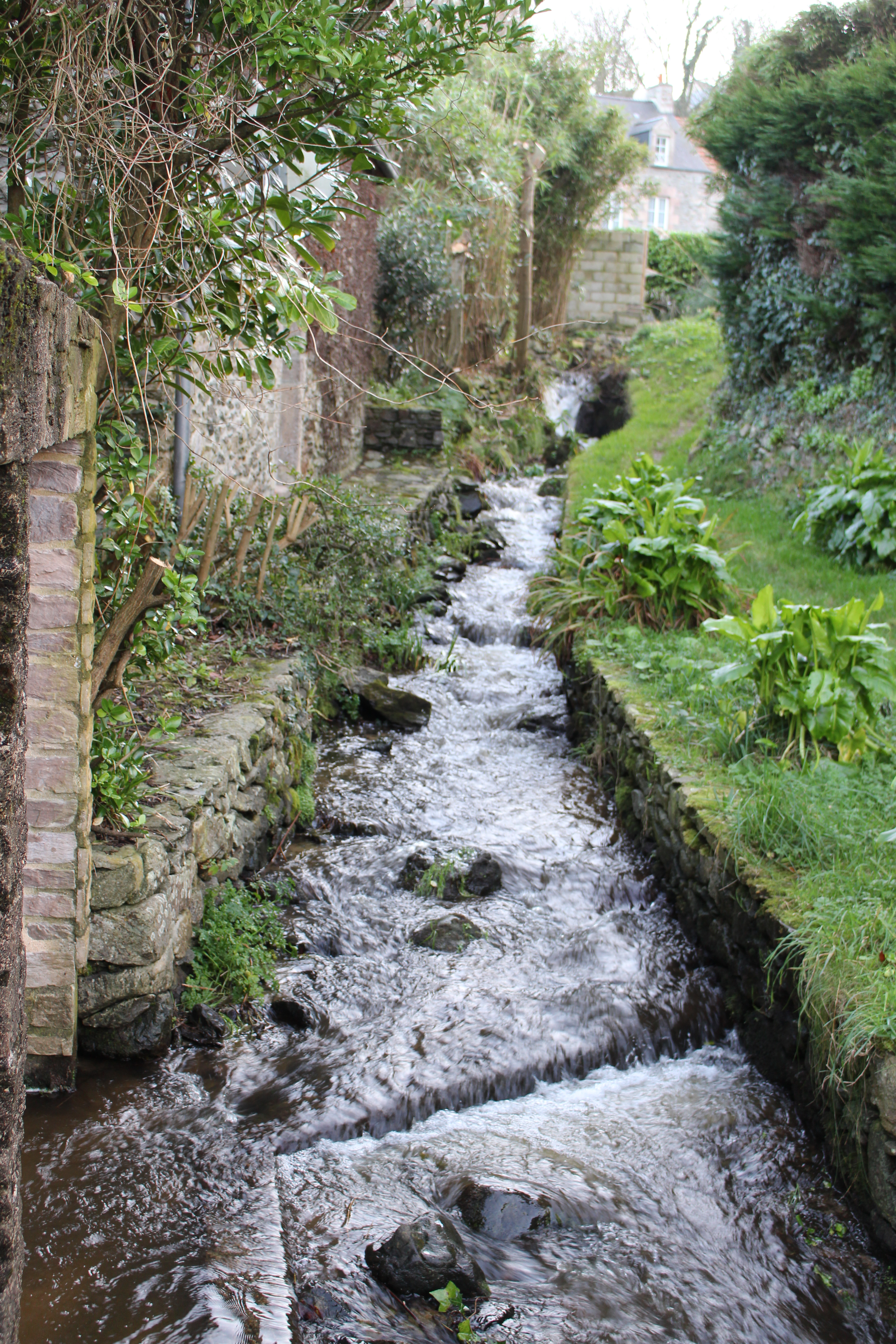
The lavoir (washhouse) of the Hubiland

The Chapelle Saint-Clair, a small building set at the foot of a sunken lane above La Rivière towards Querqueville, has been cited as a model of a religious building well integrated into its site. On the hill at Nacqueville-Haut, a memorial chapel of 1965 stands on the site of the parish church destroyed in 1944, and near the hamlet of Eudal the Oratoire Sainte-Barbe rises on a mound, with a polychrome stone statue of Saint Barbara and a votive plaque of 1748 invoking her protection against lightning, thunder and fire. Other buildings include the 17th-century Manoir de Grosmont, the Maison d'Urville (1774), La Baronnie (16th century), the coastal Fort de Nacqueville-Bas and Fort d'Urville, a wayside cross at Nicolle, and several lavoirs.

== Notable people ==
- Clair of Normandy (845–884), Benedictine monk and hermit, by local tradition.
- Jean-Nicolas Leroy, known as Moulin (1734–1794), born at Urville-Hague; director of the letter post at Cherbourg and commander of its National Guard, and the only inhabitant of Cherbourg guillotined during the Reign of Terror.
- Hippolyte Clérel de Tocqueville (1797–1877), landowner of the château de Nacqueville, deputy and senator, elder brother of Alexis de Tocqueville.
- Hildevert Hersent (1827–1903), engineer and later owner of the château de Nacqueville.
- François La Vieille (1829–1886), politician, born at Urville-Hague.
- Émile Dorrée (1883–1959), painter, who lived at Urville-Hague.
- Côtis-Capel (Albert Lohier, 1915–1986), Norman-language (Cotentinais) poet and priest, born, died and buried in the commune.
- Boris Vian (1920–1959), writer, who spent childhood holidays at Landemer.
- Infanta Eulalia of Spain (1864–1958), a guest at the villa La Mailleraie.

== Heraldry ==
Arms of Urville-Nacqueville	The arms of Urville-Nacqueville are blazoned : Gules, a leopard Or, armed and langued gules, in chief 2 gothic capital letters, U and N, Or.

The gold leopard on a red field recalls the arms of Normandy.

== See also ==
- Communes of the Manche department
- La Hague
- Raid on Cherbourg

== Bibliography ==
- Barbaroux, Jean (1982). 120 Châteaux et Manoirs en Cotentin (in French). Bayeux: Éditions Heimdal. ISBN 978-2-9021-7157-6.
- Delattre, Daniel; Delattre, Emmanuel (2002). La Manche, les 602 communes (in French). Grandvilliers: Éditions Delattre. ISBN 978-2-9159-0709-4.
- Foos-Passilly, Catherine (2022). Urville-Nacqueville dans le temps (in French).
- Gautier, René; et al. (2014). 601 communes et lieux de vie de la Manche (in French). Bayeux: Eurocibles. ISBN 978-2-35458-036-0.
- Hébert, Michel; Gervaise, André (2003). Châteaux et manoirs de la Manche (in French). Condé-sur-Noireau: Éditions Charles Corlet. ISBN 978-2-84706-143-7.
- Lefort, Anthony; et al. (2015). Artisanat, commerce et nécropole. Un port de La Tène D1 à Urville-Nacqueville (in French). ISBN 978-2-35613-129-4.
- Lecœur, Maurice (2005). Trésors du Cotentin: Architecture civile & art religieux (in French). Mayenne: Isoète. ISBN 978-2-913920-38-5.
