= Jean-Nicolas Leroy =

French postal official executed during the Terror (1734–1794)

- Born: c. 1734; Urville-Hague, Normandy, France
- Died: 23 March 1794 (3 Germinal Year II); Paris, France
- Cause of death: Execution by guillotine
- Other name: Jean-Nicolas Moulin
- Occupation: Director of the letter post at Cherbourg
- Known for: Only resident of Cherbourg executed during the Reign of Terror
- Spouse: Marie-Anne Moulin
- Children: Frédéric-Auguste Leroy

Jean-Nicolas Leroy, who took the name Jean-Nicolas Moulin during the French Revolution (c. 1734, Urville-Hague; died 23 March 1794, Paris), was a French postal official and revolutionary officeholder from the Manche. Commander of the National Guard at Cherbourg and, from October 1792, director of the town's letter post, he was, according to the local historiography, the only resident of Cherbourg executed during the Reign of Terror.

In 1793 Leroy sold part of a large accumulation of official bulletins, laws and reports that the National Convention had sent through his post office to the travelling representatives on mission. He maintained that Jean-Baptiste Carrier, a representative on mission passing through the town, had dismissed the papers as worthless and authorised their disposal. The surveillance committee of Cherbourg, prompted by its secretary, the printer Marc-Antoine Giguet, accused him instead of selling public documents for personal profit, and denounced him by printed circular to committees across the Republic.

Jean-Baptiste Le Carpentier, the representative on mission for the Manche, read his printed defence and ordered him reinstated. The order was overtaken by a decree of the Convention, passed the previous day, referring the case to the Revolutionary Tribunal in Paris. Leroy was re-arrested, held at the Conciergerie for more than three months, and tried on 23 March 1794. His chosen counsel having been denounced to the Committee of Public Safety by the Cherbourg committee and having withdrawn, his defence was taken up at the last moment by Claude François Chauveau-Lagarde. He was convicted of conspiracy and guillotined the same evening on the Place de la Révolution, leaving a widow of twenty-three and a son of seventeen months.

After the Thermidorian Reaction the société populaire of Cherbourg twice recorded in its minutes that Giguet had been the cause of Leroy's death and was guilty of a false accusation against him, and 184 notables of the town addressed a collective protest to the Convention in defence of his memory. His widow was restored to the directorship of the post. Drouet, whose 1912 study reconstructed the case from the registers of the Cherbourg revolutionary committee, argued that the bulletins affair had been a pretext, and that Leroy had in fact been destroyed because his office was coveted and because he had refused to assist the committee in intercepting private correspondence. Local historians have since treated the case as a miscarriage of revolutionary justice.

== Early life and family ==
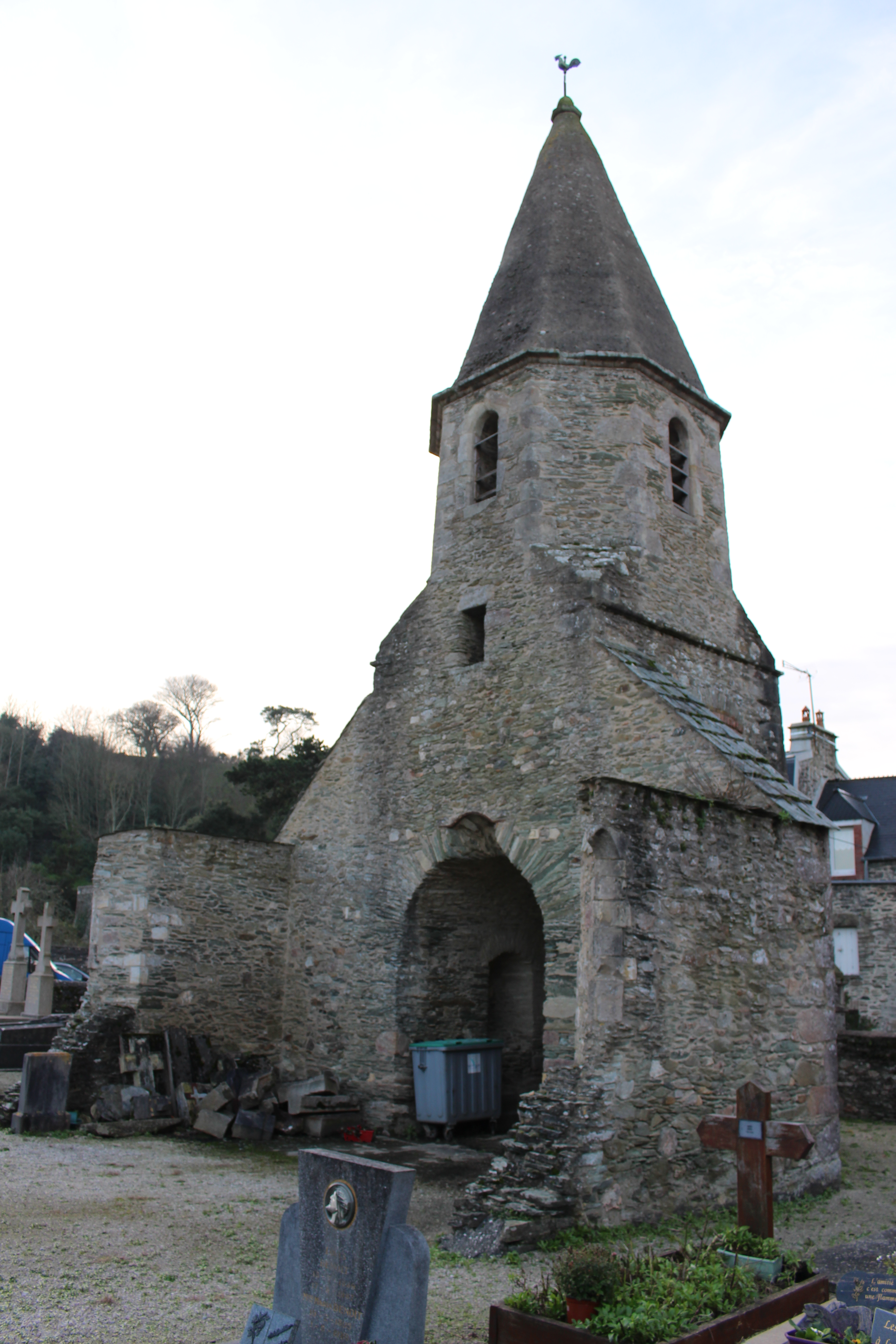
The church of Saint-Martin at Urville-Hague. Leroy was born in the parish, and his baptism and marriage records come from its registers.

Leroy was born at Urville-Hague, in La Hague, and the Manche biographical tradition gives his year of birth as 1734. His 1791 marriage record names his parents as Michel Le Roy and Jeanne Le Boisselier and describes him as a native of the parish of Urville-Hague, then living at Cherbourg. The family wrote the surname "Le Roy"; the revolutionary administration and the later literature write it "Leroy", the form used in this article. (Note: The surname is written in two forms. The family records use "Le Roy": the 1791 marriage act names the subject's parents as Michel Le Roy and Jeanne Le Boisselier and his sister as Jeanne-Barbe Le Roy, and the 1814 marriage act of his son gives "Frédéric-Auguste Le Roy". The revolutionary administration and the subsequent literature use "Leroy": so the decree of the Convention of 11 Frimaire Year II ("le citoyen Leroy"), the Revolutionary Tribunal's list of the condemned ("Moulin dit Leroy"), Drouet throughout, and the Manche biographical tradition. This article follows the latter as the form used by the sources, while noting that "Le Roy" is the form used by the family itself. Both contain the word roi, which is the reason the name was renounced in October 1793.) The list of the condemned drawn up by the Revolutionary Tribunal gives his age at death as fifty-seven, which would place his birth in about 1736. (Note: Drouet noted the discrepancy, giving 1734 from the Manche biographical tradition and 1736 as implied by the age of fifty-seven recorded at the trial.)

On 8 November 1791 Leroy married, at Surtainville, Marie-Anne Moulin (1770–1812), of the parish of Saint-Malo de Valognes, daughter of Thomas Moulin and Marie Villot and thirty-four years younger than himself; the witnesses included the bride's father, her brother Auguste Moulin, the groom's sister Jeanne-Barbe Le Roy and his nephew François-Antoine Dupont. According to Drouet, the bride's brother Irénée-Auguste Moulin later served in Italy as inspector general under General Le Marois, and was mayor and conseiller général of Bricquebec when he died in 1845. The couple's son, Frédéric-Auguste Leroy, was born at Cherbourg on 24 October 1792.

== Revolutionary career ==
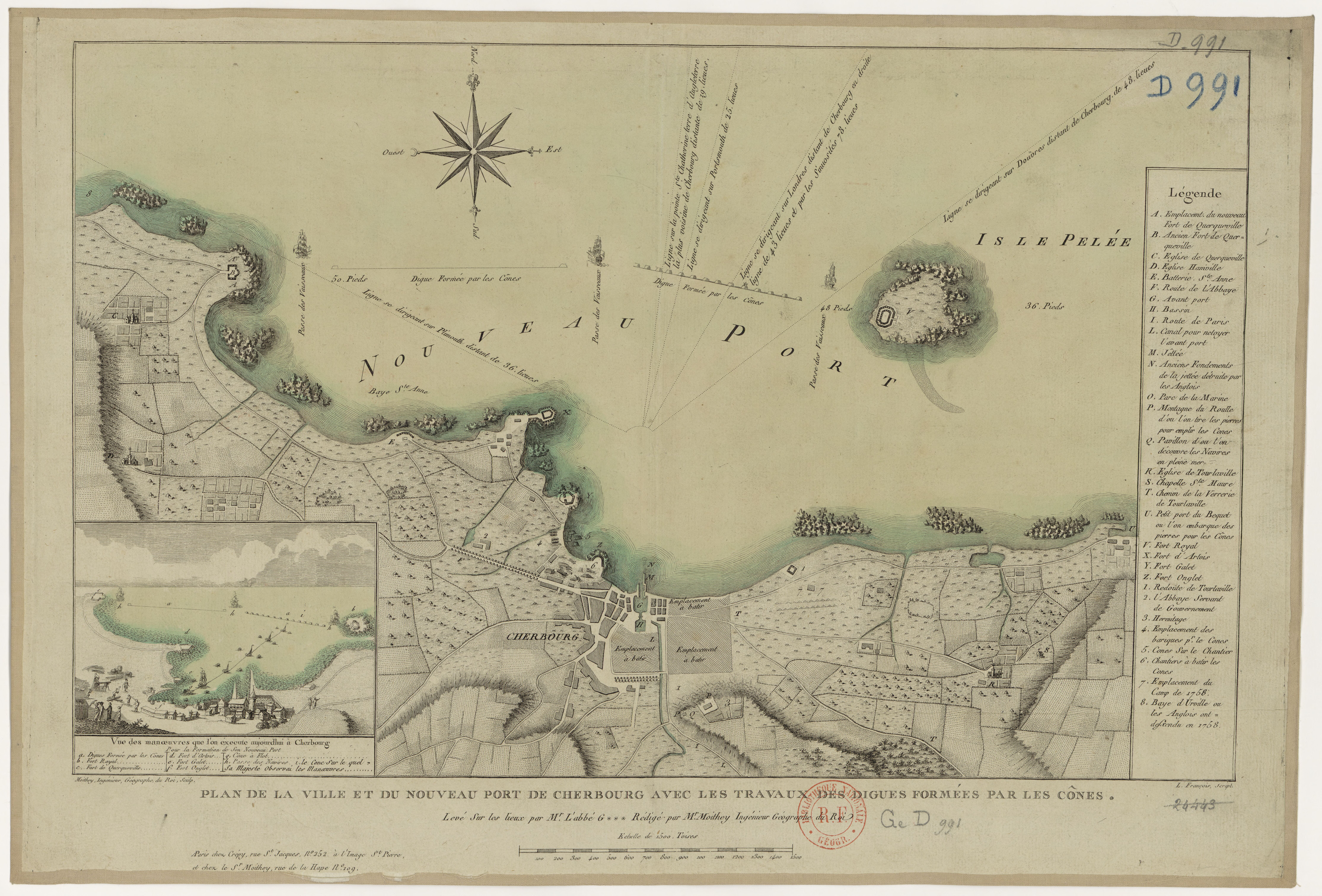
Cherbourg and the works on the new harbour, surveyed by the abbé Griel and drawn up by Moithey, 1786. The plan marks the bay of Urville, where the English landed in 1758, and the foundations of the jetty they destroyed. The dyke of timber cones sunk across the roadstead was begun in 1783 and brought money and population to the town in the years before Leroy took charge of the letter post.

Leroy commanded the Cherbourg National Guard from 1 May 1792 to 1 May 1793. On 30 Frimaire Year II his officers, sergeants, corporals and fusiliers signed a declaration that he had always carried out his duties with zeal and exactness. On 14 October 1792, offices being elective at the time, the district electoral assembly chose him director of the Cherbourg letter post by 44 votes out of 67. Besides the director, the office employed a controller, a postman and two clerks.

Drouet described him as a man who gave every public proof of patriotism, and who had no personal reason to resent a regime which had, within six months, made him commander of the guard and then director of the post, a position both comfortable and much sought after. He gave to the collections for the volunteers, twelve livres on one occasion and twenty on another, and donated a sabre and shoulder belt which he valued at forty livres. At the sale of national lands in the canton of Beaumont he bought a lot at Omonville-la-Rogue: a twelve-perch piece of arable, opened at 100 livres and adjudged to him at 510 livres on 2 August 1793.

In September 1793 Lecarpentier told the société populaire that he would not attend its meetings until it had purged its membership. Leroy submitted to the examination and was retained. The certificate he was given survives in his criminal dossier, because his wife produced it in his defence four months later. It records that at the purification of the society in September, "slave style", the citizen Moulin was kept on the list of members.

=== Change of name ===
On 28 October 1793 (7 Brumaire Year II) Leroy appeared before the general council of the commune and renounced the surname "Leroy", which recalled the word roi ("king"), adopting instead the name "Moulin", his wife's maiden name. Contemporary records accordingly name him variously as "Moulin", "Moulin dit Leroy" and "Moulin, ci-devant Leroy". The change was made four weeks before any accusation was brought against him. On the copy of his printed defence preserved in the Archives nationales the name "Leroy" was set in type at the head, then struck out and replaced in manuscript by "Moulin", with a note added at the foot of the page recording that on 7 Brumaire the director had abjured the name of Leroy to take that of his wife, and that the proof was attached.

== The Convention bulletins affair ==
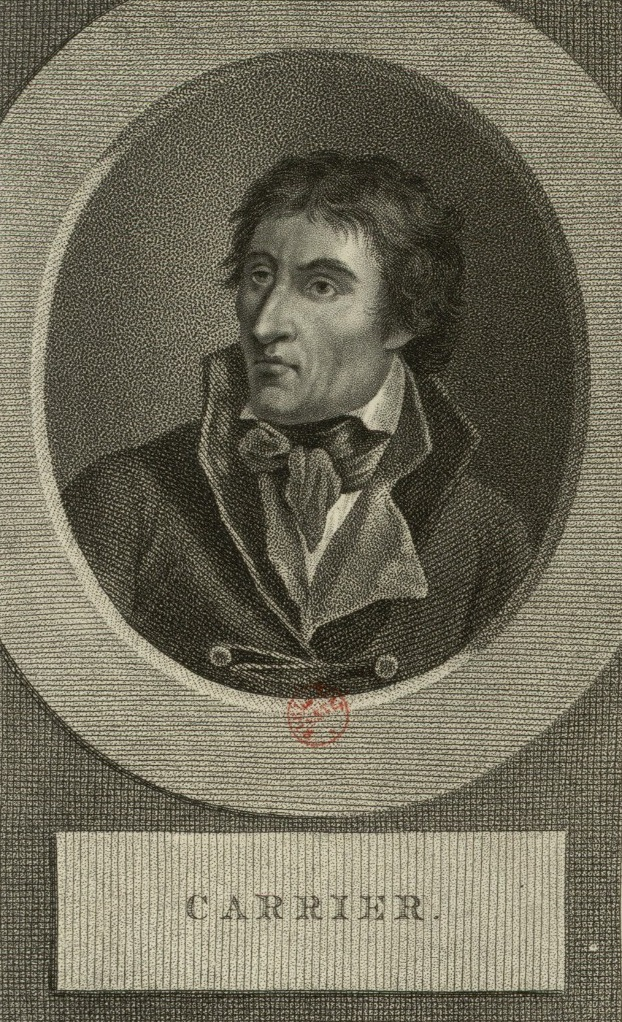
The representative on mission Jean-Baptiste Carrier, who, according to Leroy, had authorised the disposal of the accumulated papers.

=== Accumulation of the papers ===
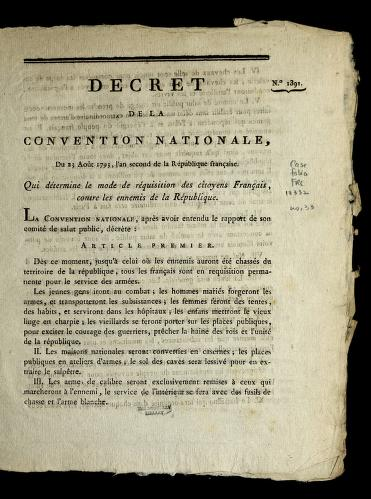
A printed decree of the National Convention, August 1793. Laws, decrees, reports and bulletins of this kind were sent through the Cherbourg post for distribution and public reading. Their accumulation, and their sale as waste paper, was the offence for which Leroy was condemned.

From June 1793 the Cherbourg post office began to fill up with newspapers, bulletins, laws and printed reports which the Convention was sending to the representatives on mission with the Army of the Coasts of Cherbourg. Those representatives were constantly on the move between the Manche and Calvados, and the federalist rising at Caen in June 1793 had cut communications. The material could not be forwarded, and it accumulated until it filled a room of its own.

Leroy set out the sequence in detail in his printed defence. At first he forwarded the packets to the representatives at Bayeux, and said the postmaster there could confirm it. After Caen rose on 9 June he stopped, believing the packets would fall into federalist hands. He asked the commissioners appointed to attend the opening of the post, Tasson and Leroy, what to do, and they told him to hold on to them. On 13 June he wrote to the deputies Lecointre and Prieur, then at Coutances, sending on their private letters and two packets and asking for instructions. He received no reply. He offered the whole accumulation to General Tilly, who refused it, and went back to Tasson, who told him it was a matter for the army of the coasts and not for the district.

In August 1793 Jean-Baptiste Carrier, deputy for the Cantal and later notorious for the drownings at Nantes, passed through Cherbourg and dismissed the papers as obsolete. Leroy afterwards maintained that Carrier had told him that packets arriving in future were to be delivered to General Tilly, which was done, and that the older material, having lost its interest, could be kept and disposed of as he saw fit. The address of the Cherbourg notables to the Convention in 1795 reports Carrier's reply in blunter terms, as an instruction to make "cabbages and turnips" of them.

Leroy sold part of the stock at six sols the pound to two grocers of the neighbourhood, Macé of the rue de la Vase and Le Buhotel of the rue de la Fontaine.

=== Denunciation ===
Marc-Antoine Giguet, a printer of the rue des Corderies, was a member of the general council of the commune and secretary of the committee of surveillance; his garden adjoined Leroy's in the rue Christine. Drouet records the deposition of Leroy's servant that Giguet, standing in his own garden, had on one occasion overheard part of a conversation between her master and several other persons.

When Giguet heard about the sale he bought some of the papers back from Le Buhotel, took them home, and called the committee to his own house to inspect the evidence there. He added that Le Buhotel had mentioned a further four hundred pounds weight of the same material elsewhere. The committee questioned Le Buhotel, his servant Rose Marvie, and a marine employee named Chapuy. Le Buhotel claimed he did not know where the papers had come from or who had brought them, although Leroy lived some fifty metres away. His servant's evidence was more damaging: the parcels had always come after dark, tied in bundles, and had been left not in the shop but in her master's bedroom.

A search of the post office turned up twenty-nine sealed packets in a loft, said to hold about four hundred bulletins each, still under the seal of the Convention and addressed to the representatives with the army of the coasts.

Leroy was questioned the same day. Asked whether he had sold papers to Le Buhotel, he said he had sold him none, but had given him what was left over and received some soap in exchange. Asked what he had intended to do with those found at his house, he said "nothing": he had told Carrier about them and been told to keep them, since the men they were addressed to were away, and most were no longer current, so he had seen no point in sending them on.

On 25 November 1793 (5 Frimaire Year II) the committee denounced Leroy to the Committee of Public Safety, to the representative on mission, and by printed circular to surveillance committees across the Republic. The letter to Paris called the discovery an infamy and the director a monster in the pay of the Brissotin faction, who by holding back the bulletins had deprived the citizens of instruction. The circular told committees elsewhere to descend on their own post offices without warning, seize any bulletins of the Convention they found, and establish whether the same thing was going on locally. The letter to the Committee of Public Safety called him "Monsieur le Roi (sic)", four weeks after he had renounced the name in front of the committee's own general council.

Leroy was confined to his house under guard and temporarily replaced at the post office by Victor Lefourdrey, a former surgeon of twenty, whom the committee described to the minister of the interior as a sans-culotte republican who had always been the terror of moderates and aristocrats.

=== Leroy's defence ===
Leroy had a memoir printed in the town, addressed to Lecarpentier, the committee of surveillance and his fellow citizens, and distributed it. Drouet described it, with the depositions, as the principal document of the file and reproduced it in full. In it Leroy set out the chronology of the accumulation and of his repeated requests for instructions, and concluded:

Following Carrier's reply, I regarded these papers as useless and believed I might, without thinking to do wrong, give a part of them in exchange for various objects useful to a household. That is the most exact truth.

He denied the report that packets received as late as Brumaire had been found at his house, appealing to the members of the committee who had opened them, and ended:

I am innocent, and I call to witness those who know me personally. Since the Revolution I have made every sacrifice in my power: clothes, sabres, shoes, money, I have given all with pleasure for my brothers in arms. I have been scrutinised for my place, for the club, for my certificate of civism; everywhere I have been done justice. You have always given me your confidence, my fellow citizens: this action cannot lose it for me. I place myself entirely in the justice of the representative of the people and of the committee of surveillance; better informed of the facts, they will hasten to restore liberty and honour to a father unjustly accused, and happiness to a desolate family.

He also wrote to Carrier on 7 Frimaire, reminding him of their conversation at General Tilly's and asking him to attest it, and closing: "You are just, you will not hesitate to answer me and attest the truth of these facts. Republicans owe one another aid and assistance; it is on that ground that I call upon you today." No reply is recorded.

== Prosecution and execution ==
=== Reinstatement and referral ===
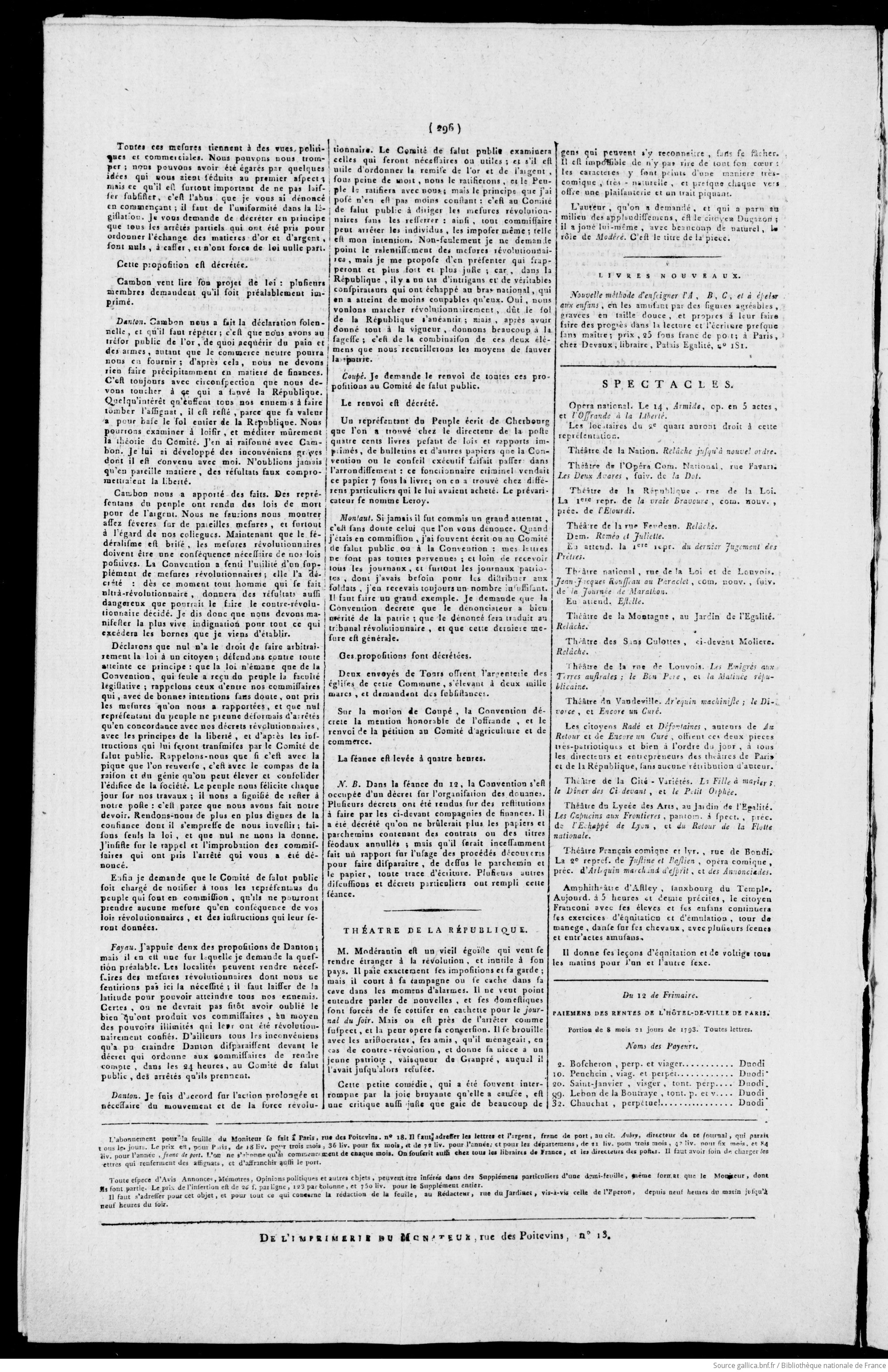
The report of the sitting of 11 Frimaire Year II in the Gazette nationale ou le Moniteur universel: "A representative of the People writes from Cherbourg that there have been found at the house of the director of the post four hundred pounds weight of printed laws and reports, bulletins and other papers... this criminal functionary was selling this paper at 7 sols the pound... The prevaricator is named Leroy." Montaut's motion follows immediately.

Lecarpentier read Leroy's printed defence, decided the offence did not warrant prosecution, and on 2 December 1793 (12 Frimaire Year II) ordered him reinstated. The committee wrote to the postal administration the same day, reporting that the representative did not consider the offence serious enough to merit such a punishment.

The reprieve was overtaken by events in Paris. The day before, on 1 December 1793 (11 Frimaire Year II), the National Convention had considered a communication reporting that four hundred pounds weight of laws, printed reports and bulletins had been found at the house of the director of the post at Cherbourg, and that he had been selling the paper at seven sols the pound. (Note: The two figures given in the sources differ. Drouet, following the file, records the sale at six sols the pound, and states that the grocer Le Buhotel resold at a profit of one sol the pound. The communication read to the Convention, and the indictment which followed it, give seven sols.) The deputy Louis Maribon de Montaut, a former musketeer of Louis XVI, spoke in support, stating that when he had himself been on mission his letters had not all arrived and that he had never received a sufficient number of patriotic newspapers to distribute to the soldiers. He moved that the Convention decree that the denouncer had deserved well of the Fatherland, that the denounced be sent before the Revolutionary Tribunal, and that the measure be general. The motion was carried. Drouet records that no voice was raised in the accused's defence or to request an explanation.

The decree reached Cherbourg on 6 December (16 Frimaire) and Leroy was re-arrested the same day. The committee wrote to Lecarpentier that he had been deceived in ordering the release, that the aristocrats had rejoiced at the prospect that the committee had lost his confidence, and that the decree was for them a blow from a club. Lecarpentier replied in terms rallying to the committee's view; Drouet was unable to locate the letter.

=== Transfer to Paris and the defence ===
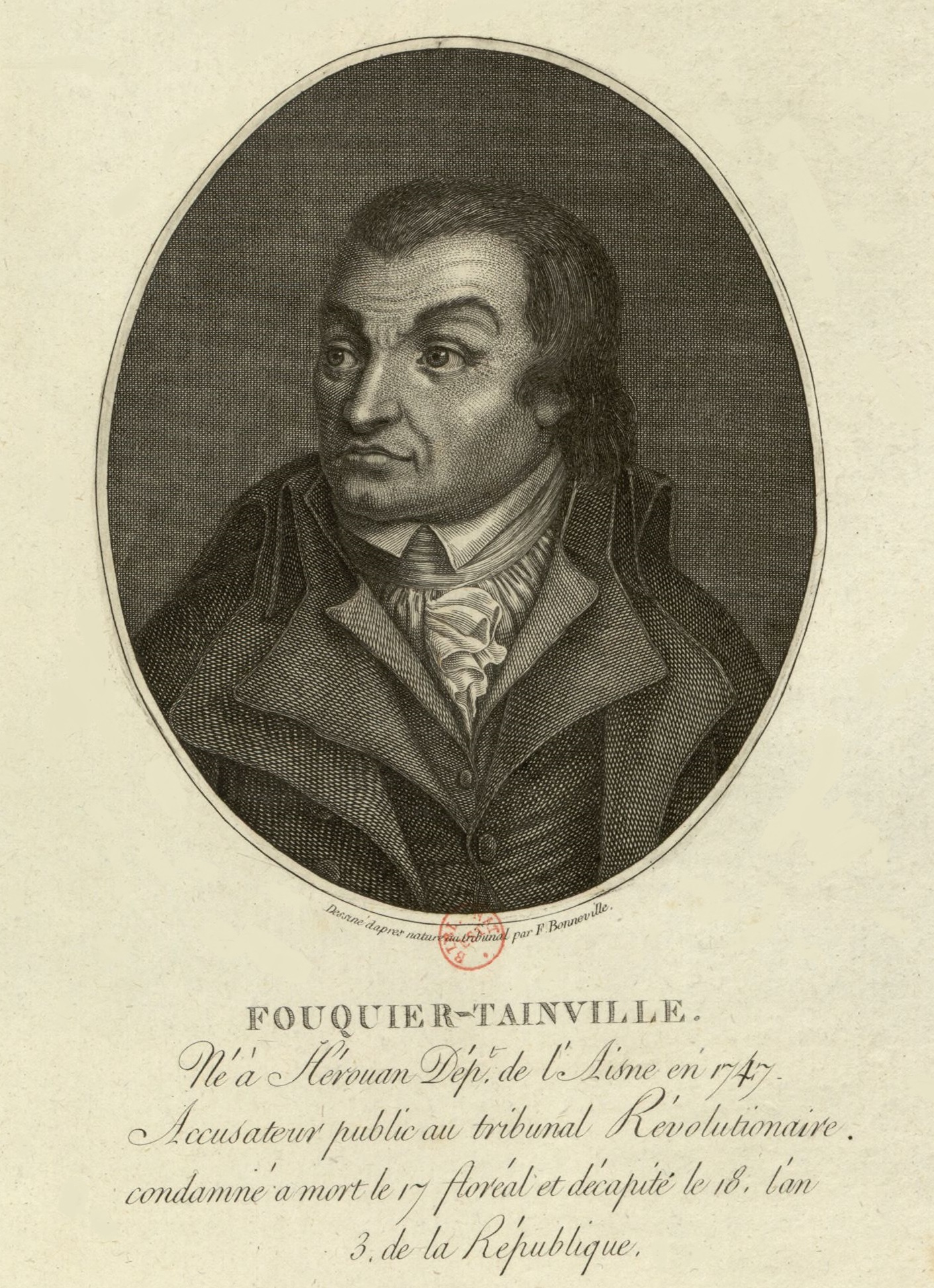
Fouquier-Tinville, public prosecutor of the Tribunal

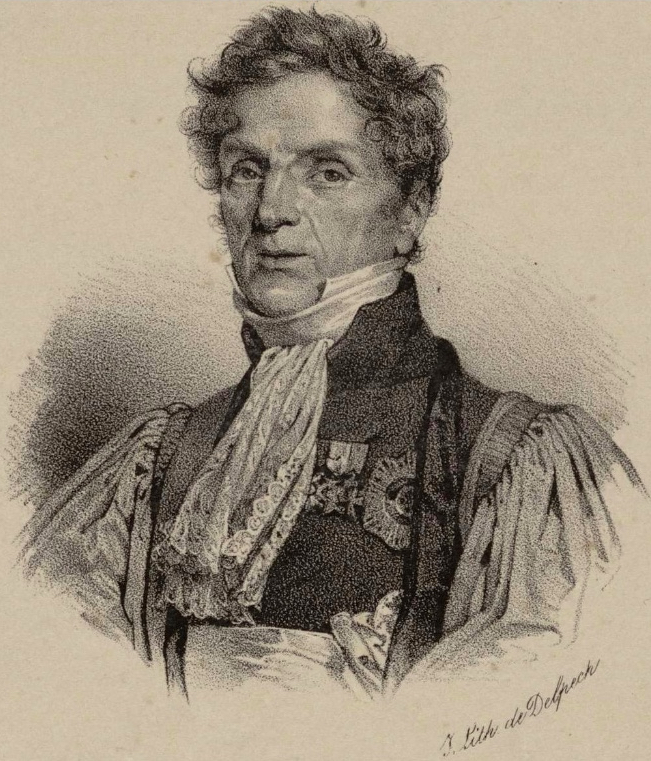
Chauveau-Lagarde, Leroy's defence counsel

Leroy left for Paris on 9 December (19 Frimaire) and was held at the Conciergerie. Travelling by the same coach was Pierre-Guyon Duprey, a Cherbourg advocate admitted in 1787, who had undertaken his defence. Duprey had been an active figure in the local societies and had presided over the purification of the popular society, but had subsequently been struck from its register and was by then regarded as a suspect.

On the day Duprey left, the committee wrote ahead of him to Publicola Chossart, chief of the bureaux of the Committee of Public Safety. The letter identified Duprey as a former adherent of Dumouriez in Belgium who had lately been expelled from the club and stripped of his functions, and warned that he had gone to Paris to defend the postmaster whom the Tribunal was about to try on the committee's denunciation. It ended by expressing confidence that Chossart's republicanism would put the information to good use.

Drouet concluded that the committee meant to have the lawyer arrested and so leave the accused undefended, and that it worked. Le Buhotel, arriving in Paris to give evidence, was told that the Cherbourg committee's denunciation had forced Duprey either to leave the city or to go into hiding on the eve of the trial.

The defence was taken up at the last moment by Claude François Chauveau-Lagarde, who had defended Charlotte Corday in July 1793 and Marie Antoinette in October, and who after the latter trial had been summoned before the Committee of General Security and accused of having defended her too well.

Leroy was interrogated before the Tribunal on 25 December 1793 (5 Nivôse Year II); the record of that interrogation has not survived. The indictment was drawn in the name of the public prosecutor Antoine Quentin Fouquier-Tinville. It charged that Leroy, who must have known how carefully the Convention worked to spread the truth throughout the Republic, had instead kept back printed matter meant for public instruction and sold it for his own profit. This was an abuse of the trust placed in a public official, and, the indictment argued, could only be the work of an agent of the conspiracy then at large in that part of the country.

=== Trial ===
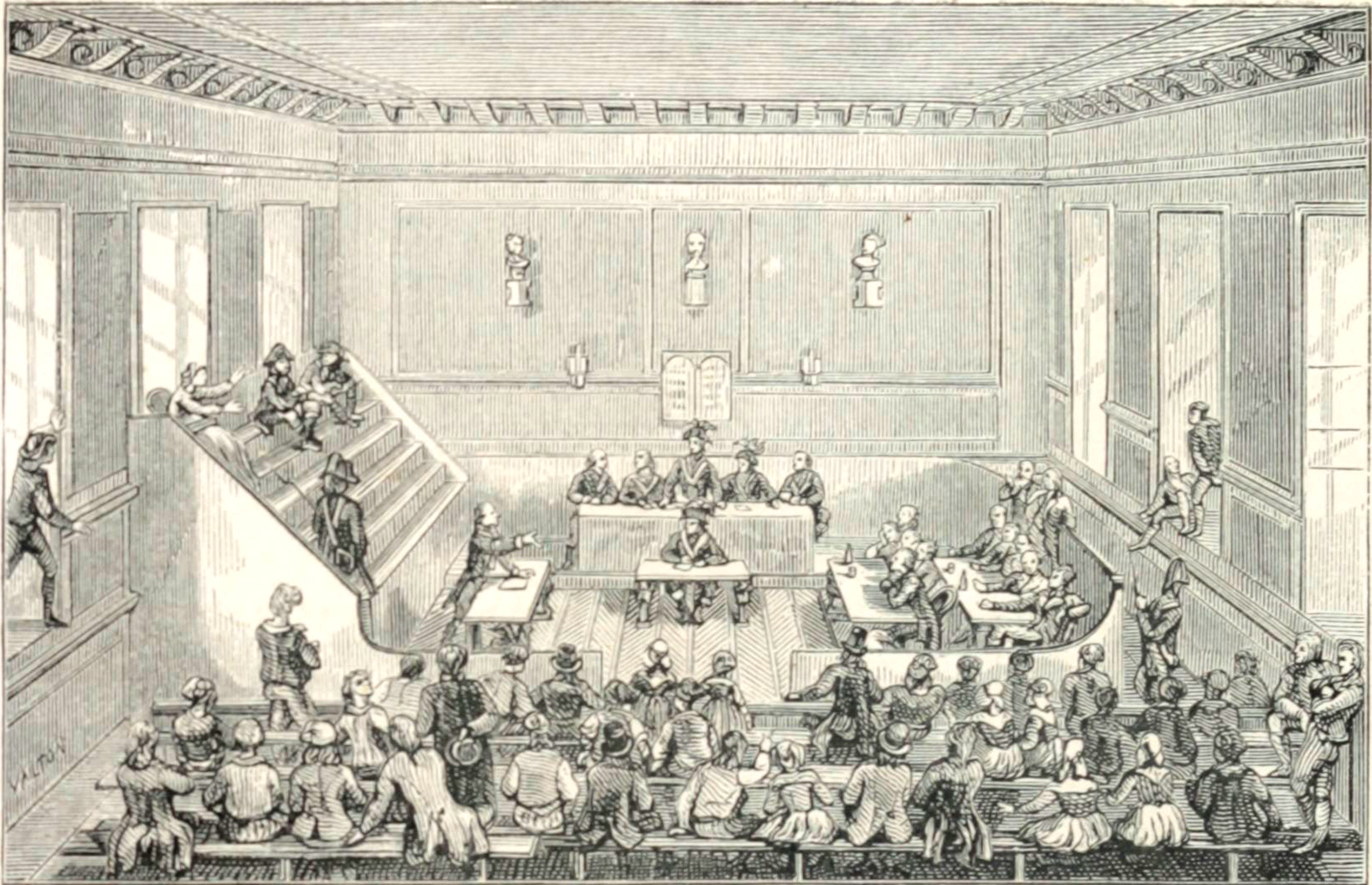
The Revolutionary Tribunal sitting, in an engraving published in 1868. Leroy was tried in the salle de l'Égalité, the smaller of the two chambers, while the trial of the Hébertists occupied the great chamber next door.

Leroy was tried on Sunday 23 March 1794 (3 Germinal Year II) in the salle de l'Égalité, the former Tournelle. The trial of the Hébertists had opened two days earlier in the great chamber and, according to Drouet, drew the crowd away from the smaller room. The court was presided over by Claude Emmanuel Dobsen, sitting with the judges François-Joseph Denizot and Gabriel Deliège; Drouet names the twelve jurors and notes, citing Lenôtre, that Deliège had been among the judges and Devèze and Baron among the jurors who condemned Marie Antoinette. Immediately before Leroy's case the Tribunal had condemned to death Anne-François Poitou, curé of Vaux, in the district of Saint-Germain-en-Laye. The two men are recorded consecutively in the Tribunal's papers, as dossiers 615 and 616 of carton W//339; dossier 617, judged the following day, contains the Hébertists.

Six witnesses were called, all by the prosecution: Giguet, aged 34, printer at Cherbourg; Le Buhotel, aged 29; Rose Marvie, aged 19, servant to Le Buhotel; Claude Macé, aged 52; François-Jérôme Chapuy, of the marine administration at Cherbourg; and Laurent Lecointre, aged 48, deputy of Versailles, who had been among the intended recipients of the bulletins. Because the Tribunal judged without appeal, no record was kept of the depositions.

Chauveau-Lagarde asked the court to let the witnesses be questioned about Leroy's conduct and civic record, and the court agreed. Drouet reconstructed what Giguet then said from an inquiry held by the reconstituted revolutionary committee on 3 Ventôse Year III. Le Buhotel, deposing at that inquiry, recalled Giguet telling the Tribunal that he had never thought Leroy anything but an enemy of the revolution and a bad citizen in the eyes of everyone in Cherbourg, and citing an occasion when Leroy was supposed to have complained about grain being carted out of Cherbourg to supply other districts, saying that if he had the power he would stop it. According to Le Buhotel, this evidence turned the Tribunal sharply against him. The 1795 address of the notables asserts that Giguet had left Cherbourg having promised to make Leroy's head fall, that he had appeared before the Tribunal as an accuser rather than a witness, and that he had shown impatience at the hesitation of the jurors.

Two questions went to the jury. First, whether there had been an abuse of the nation's trust at Cherbourg, in that a public official had sold for his own profit the bulletins, reports, laws and other writings sent to public officials to enlighten the French people, an offence held to imply collusion with conspirators. Second, whether Moulin, formerly Leroy, was guilty of it. The jury answered yes to both. The 1795 address states that five of the twelve jurors voted for acquittal; Drouet questioned how far the assertion could be credited.

Leroy was condemned to death, with confiscation of his property to the Republic, under the law of 4 December 1792 against those who should seek to establish royalty or any other power infringing the sovereignty of the people, and the judgment was ordered to be published by placard and printing.

=== Execution ===
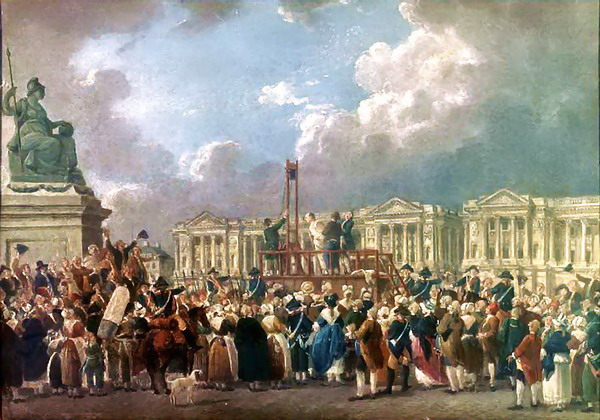
An execution on the Place de la Révolution, where Leroy was guillotined on 23 March 1794.

He was guillotined the same evening on the Place de la Révolution, the curé Poitou sharing his conveyance. The Tribunal's list of the condemned records him as "Moulin (dit Leroy), Jean-Nicolas, aged 57, director of the letter post of Cherbourg", condemned as a conspirator for having sold for his own profit the Convention's bulletins, reports and laws. The notice was reproduced in the Paris press; the Journal du Matin des Amis de la Liberté, which acted as correspondent in Paris for the Cherbourg popular society, recorded that the execution had taken place within twenty-four hours.

Neither Carrier nor General Tilly was called to give evidence, although both names appear on the list of witnesses to figure in the affair; Drouet found no explanation for this in the file.

== The secrecy of the letters ==
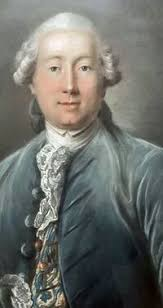
Jacques-Martin Maurice, contractor of the works in the Cherbourg roadstead. His was the first name on the committee's order of 12 Frimaire Year II directing that letters be intercepted without the knowledge of the director of the post.

The 1795 address of the Cherbourg notables to the Convention states that Leroy was denounced and prosecuted because it was wished to bring down a functionary whose place was coveted and who would not have lent himself to the violation of the secrecy of the letters.

Drouet supported this by two entries which he found in the correspondence register of the Cherbourg committee of surveillance. The first is dated 12 Frimaire Year II, at a time when Leroy was under house arrest but had not been removed from his office. It is addressed to Delauney, a postman of Cherbourg:

We invite you, on your own responsibility, to stop all letters or packets addressed to the citizens Maurice, Deriencourt or Jolivet, Vanier, or any other person of Maurice's household. You will hand them to us sealed and, after examination, we will return them to you to be delivered. There is no need to recommend the greatest secrecy to you. Your interest requires it. Your republicanism makes it a law. You will not inform your Director of this measure.

The persons named belonged to one household. Jacques-Martin Maurice was the contractor of the works in the Cherbourg roadstead, and it was his house in the rue de la Marine that had been requisitioned to lodge the representative Lecarpentier on his arrival in the town in September 1793. A Jolivet de Riencourt had married at Cherbourg in 1788 into the Maurice family, and Maurice's granddaughter Mélanie Jolivet de Riencourt married Leroy's son in 1814.

The second entry is dated 9 Floréal Year III, five weeks after the execution, and is addressed to Leroy's successor. It states that it was no longer necessary for him to hand over the correspondence of four named persons, and continues:

We had recommended your predecessor to hand us the letters of these various persons. But instead of serving us, as a good and brave republican, he has, we are certain of it, disclosed our measures and prevented the salutary effect which might have resulted.

Drouet observed that no accusation of violating the secrecy of the letters was ever brought against Leroy by his most determined adversaries. The same charge was afterwards made against Lefourdrey, his successor, whom the 1795 address of the notables accused of having violated the secrecy of the letters with an affected impudence, and Drouet noted that Lefourdrey, who received the letter of 9 Floréal, appears to have complied with the instruction given to him. On this evidence Drouet concluded that the bulletins had furnished a pretext, and that the true cause of the prosecution was that Leroy's office was coveted and that he had refused to lend himself to the interception of private correspondence.

== Aftermath ==
Five days after the execution the committee wrote to the public prosecutor. The newspapers, they said, had informed them of the judgment against the former director of their commune's post office; the guilty man had been punished, and the example would no doubt deter others. They had, however, been left holding a considerable quantity of bulletins and newspapers, some still under the seal of the Convention, and they asked what he intended to do with them, so that they might be relieved of their bulk and of the trouble of guarding them.

Giguet returned to Cherbourg on 25 March 1794 (5 Germinal) and took his seat again on the general council and the committee. Le Buhotel's brother later deposed that at an inn at Caen on the way home Giguet had said repeatedly that the former director was a counter-revolutionary and an enemy of liberty, known as such to all Cherbourg; and that when Duprey walked into the room, Giguet remarked that if the lawyer came back to Cherbourg he had a good mind to have him arrested too. It was Giguet who represented the commune when the seals were put on Leroy's house, and again when the widow applied for the return of clothing left in her husband's room. Le Buhotel, who had been imprisoned when the denunciation was made, was sent back to prison on his return from Paris and released about five months later.

The deputy Lecointre subsequently published a pamphlet, "L'abus des pouvoirs illimités", directed against the acts of his colleague Legot, then sent to the Manche to replace Lecarpentier; it stated that Leroy had been justly punished and attacked his widow and her brother. Giguet reprinted the passages concerning Leroy at his own expense and had them distributed in the town.

On 10 March 1795 (20 Ventôse Year III) 184 notables of Cherbourg, among them the advocate Duprey, addressed a protest to the Convention in defence of Leroy's memory, denouncing Lecointre and describing Giguet as the assassin of Leroy. The popular society lodged a complaint against Giguet with the representative Hubert, which was referred for inquiry to the reconstituted revolutionary committee; in the course of that inquiry Le Buhotel deposed that he remembered Leroy's death but was unable to say whether he had been justly or unjustly condemned. Giguet was disarmed, imprisoned, released, imprisoned again and finally set at liberty after some weeks.

=== Giguet ===
Drouet's characterisation of Giguet is severe. He described him as one of those barely formed creatures whom periods of upheaval suddenly throw up, whose sinister faces the times bring to the surface, and added that the breed was not extinct. Contemporaries, he wrote, had done no more than justice in calling him during his lifetime an imbecile and a ferocious executioner: a vindictive and bloodthirsty man who seemed to do evil for the pleasure of it, who boasted of it, and before whom everyone bowed. The 1795 address of the notables called him the assassin of Leroy.

His wife took an active part in the pursuit. When Lecointre published his pamphlet defending the execution, Drouet records that the passages concerning Leroy were carried free through every quarter of the town by Giguet or by his wife. The address of the notables attacked her directly, describing her as a shrew and a prostitute who ran the streets like a bacchante distributing Lecointre's work, and Drouet notes that the writings of the period did not hesitate to apply such terms to her. Nothing further is recorded of her, and she disappears from the sources with her husband after Year VI.

Drouet treated Giguet's persistence, which continued for years after the execution, as the central difficulty of the case. Observing that such hatred was almost without example, he asked where it had come from. Since the two men were neighbours, he considered whether some quarrel between the households might lie behind it, of the kind that produces animosity out of all proportion to its cause, and thought it tempting to believe. He rejected it nonetheless, on the ground that nothing in the dossier supported the idea, and concluded that Giguet's conduct was better explained by a fanaticism as close to insanity as to barbarism, of which he found the formula in the committee's own words to Lecarpentier: "The Republic or death, that is our motto."

=== The popular society in 1795 ===
The minutes of the Cherbourg société populaire for the winter of 1794 to 1795, summarised by the abbé Alfred Leroy from the town archives in a study published in 1885, record the society's proceedings against those of its own members associated with the Terror. In February 1795 the society denounced Lecarpentier to the Convention as the author of the oppressions committed in the district, and named with him Aristide De Lisle, the elder and younger Lefourdrey, Rayebois, Fossard, Huet, Cordebard, Gillot, and "Giguet, cause of the death of poor Leroy".

The society subsequently resolved to request the representative Legot to dismiss all those holding office whom it regarded as terrorists, naming in particular Rayebois, Bourgoise, a captain of gunners, and "the scoundrel Giguet, guilty of false accusation against the citizen Leroy"; after Legot had dismissed several officeholders the society asked him to remove Fossard, Lemière and Giguet also. It further asked the general council to change the name of the rue au Fourdrey, on the same grounds on which the names of Marat and other figures were being removed from public places and from shipping; the council renamed the street rue Traversière.

The same source records that the society applauded the denunciation of Lecarpentier sent to the Convention by the citoyenne Lefranc of Cherbourg as early as Thermidor Year II. The municipality installed on 24 February 1795 comprised Augustin Asselin as mayor with Chantereyne, Maurice, Buhotel and others as municipal officers; in the following month the general council appointed two commissioners to draw up an inventory of the papers of the revolutionary committee.

== Family and later history ==
Leroy's widow was restored to the directorship of the post under the representative Legot, on the petition of the societies of the commune. In Nivôse Year VI (1798) the post office was searched at seven in the morning, on a denunciation that it was a centre of royalist conspiracy. The evidence was a red wax seal bearing a royal escutcheon which the denouncer, Giguet, said he had found in his newspaper. The general council threw the accusation out and declared that the widow had lost none of the confidence of good republicans. Drouet notes that Giguet disappears from the sources after this.

The widow remarried on 6 Fructidor Year VI (1798) to a man named Humbert, employed in military subsistence, and died in 1812 at the age of forty-two, still directress of the post. One of her daughters by the second marriage was the mother of the abbé Vignon, curé-doyen of La Haye-Pesnel, who left a family memoir.

The son of the first marriage, Frédéric-Auguste Leroy, was given the directorship of the Cherbourg letter post when he turned twenty, which Drouet took to be a form of reparation for his father's condemnation. His marriage at Cherbourg in 1814, to Mélanie Jolivet de Riencourt, records him as director of the letter post and as the son of the late Jean-Nicolas Leroy. Mélanie Jolivet de Riencourt was a granddaughter, on her mother's side, of Jacques-Martin Maurice, the contractor of the works in the Cherbourg roadstead, whose correspondence the committee of surveillance had ordered intercepted in December 1793. He had long been retired when he died in 1875, in the rue de la Marine; his daughter married an advocate named Boullement d'Ingremard.

== Historiography ==
The case attracted little attention in Cherbourg's published annals in the nineteenth century. Drouet noted that to find any connected account of it before his own it was necessary to consult Émile Sarot's study of the inhabitants of the Manche before the Revolutionary Tribunal, published at Coutances in 1877. The abbé Alfred Leroy, curé of Valognes and a member of the Société académique de Cherbourg, had meanwhile summarised the relevant proceedings of the popular society in the second series of Le vieux Cherbourg, published posthumously in 1885; that volume records the society's own resolutions naming Giguet, and is independent of Drouet's later reconstruction, although the editor notes gaps in the abbé's manuscript.

Drouet's own study was written after the registers of the Cherbourg revolutionary committee were rediscovered at Saint-Lô by Charles Jean, and drew on those registers, on the committee's letter book, on the registers of the popular society and the general council, and on the criminal dossier in the Archives nationales. (Note: The departmental archives of the Manche at Saint-Lô were largely destroyed by bombardment on 6 June 1944, with losses estimated at some 85,000 articles, including series relating to the revolutionary period. Drouet's 1912 transcriptions therefore preserve material whose originals may no longer exist. The criminal dossier, held in Paris, was unaffected.) The Dictionnaire des personnages remarquables de la Manche (2001) follows Drouet in treating Leroy as the only inhabitant of Cherbourg executed during the Terror and his condemnation as a judicial error.
