= Château de Nacqueville =

Château in Manche, Normandy, France

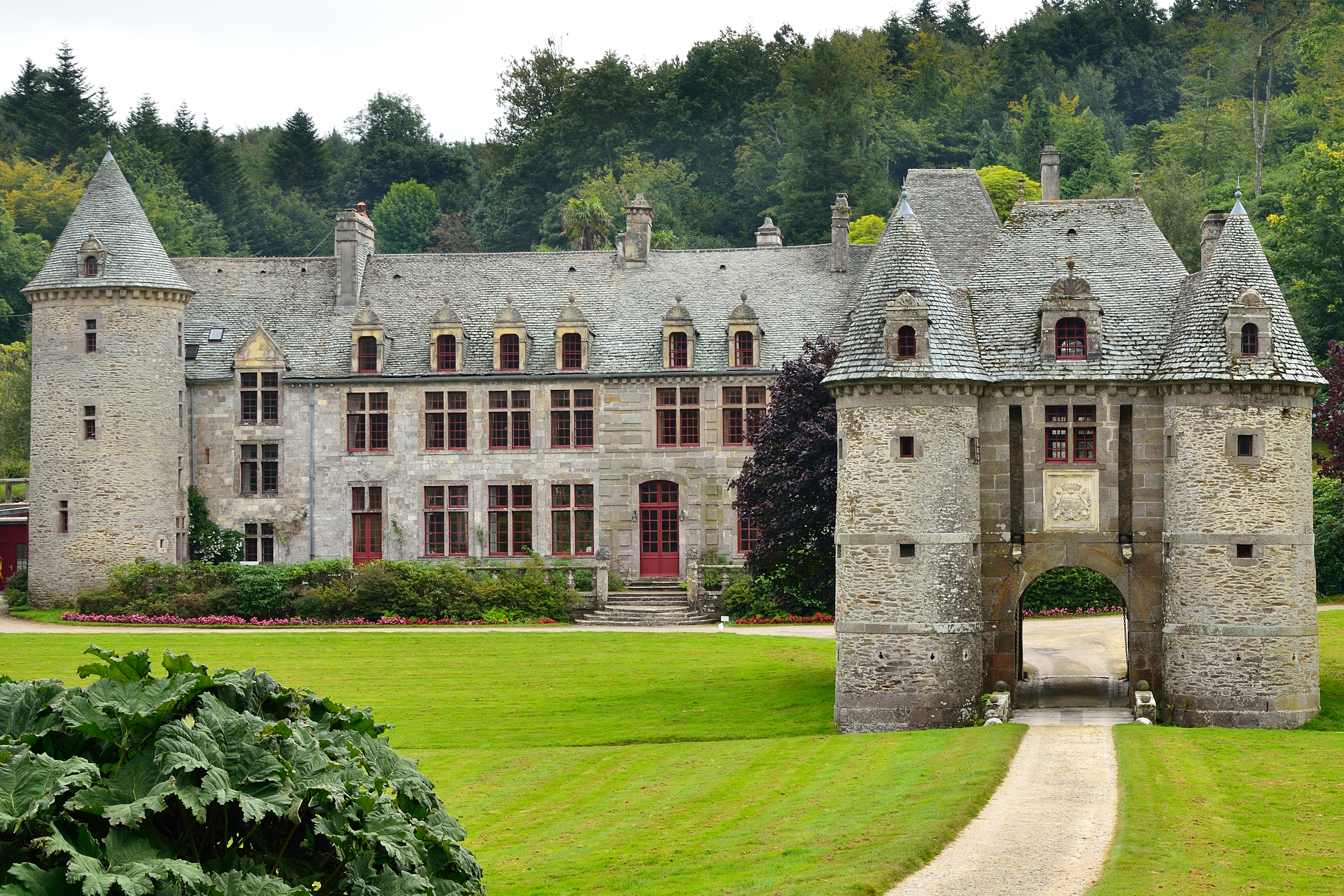
- The Château de Nacqueville

- Location in France
- 49°39′44″N 1°43′22″W
- Type: Château
- Location: La Hague (Urville-Nacqueville), Manche, Normandy, France

History
- Built: 16th century
- Rebuilt: 17th century; restored 19th century

Site notes
- Architectural style: Renaissance
- Owner: Florence and Thierry d'Harcourt

Monument historique
- Designated: 16 May 1944 (gate and drawbridge); 20 November 1992 (façades, roofs and park)
- Reference no.: PA00110623

The Château de Nacqueville, also known as the Château de Fourneville, is a 15th- and 16th-century residence, remodelled in the 17th and 19th centuries, that stands in the northern Cotentin on the territory of the former commune of Urville-Nacqueville, in the Manche department of Normandy, France. Built by the Grimouville family and later held by relatives of the political thinker Alexis de Tocqueville, the estate is partly listed as a Monument historique, and its 19th-century landscape park holds the Jardin remarquable label.

== Location ==
The château lies in a valley near woodland, on the edge of Querqueville, over which part of the estate extends, about 1.8 km (1.1 mi) south-east of the church of Urville-Nacqueville, within the new commune of La Hague in the Manche department. The estate occupies three small valleys that converge on the château and is watered by the Castelets stream, which flows down towards the sea.

== History ==
The history of Nacqueville, spanning some five centuries, is closely linked to that of the three successive families who made it their home: the Grimouville in the 16th and 17th centuries; the Mangon, their relatives the Barbout de Querqueville and then the Tocqueville in the 18th and 19th centuries; and the Hersent and their descendants from 1880 to the present day.

=== The Grimouville family ===
The seigneury of Nacqueville arose from the union of two neighbouring fiefs, Fourneville and Les Marets (Marais-de-Haut), whose families merged by marriage or purchase. It was established in a manor house built for the purpose, the château de Nacqueville, and was held from the barony of Bricquebec.

In the 13th century the Carbonnel family were lords of Les Marets. In 1334, Jean de Carbonnel, husband of Guillemette-Aux-Épaules of Sainte-Marie-du-Mont, was lord of the Marais. The seigneury was either exchanged or sold in 1505 to Pierre de Saint-Gilles.

The other part of the original fief, Fourneville, was in the hands of Jean de Grimouville, a member of an old Norman family, as early as 1501. He began the construction of a solid fortified building on the site of the present manor, enclosed by a defensive wall some 6 m (20 ft) high. In 1525, his son Jean VI de Grimouville (of Fourneville) married his neighbour Renée de Saint-Gilles (of Le Marais), joining the two fiefs. It was probably in the second half of the 16th century that Pierre de Grimouville, son of Jean II, and his wife Guillemette d'Argouges (Note: The arms of the d'Argouges family appeared on the pediment of the château and on the vault of the chapel.) completed the manor as it appears today. In 1610, the fief of Fourneville was united with that of Les Marets, forming a single seigneury.

=== The Mangon and Tocqueville period ===
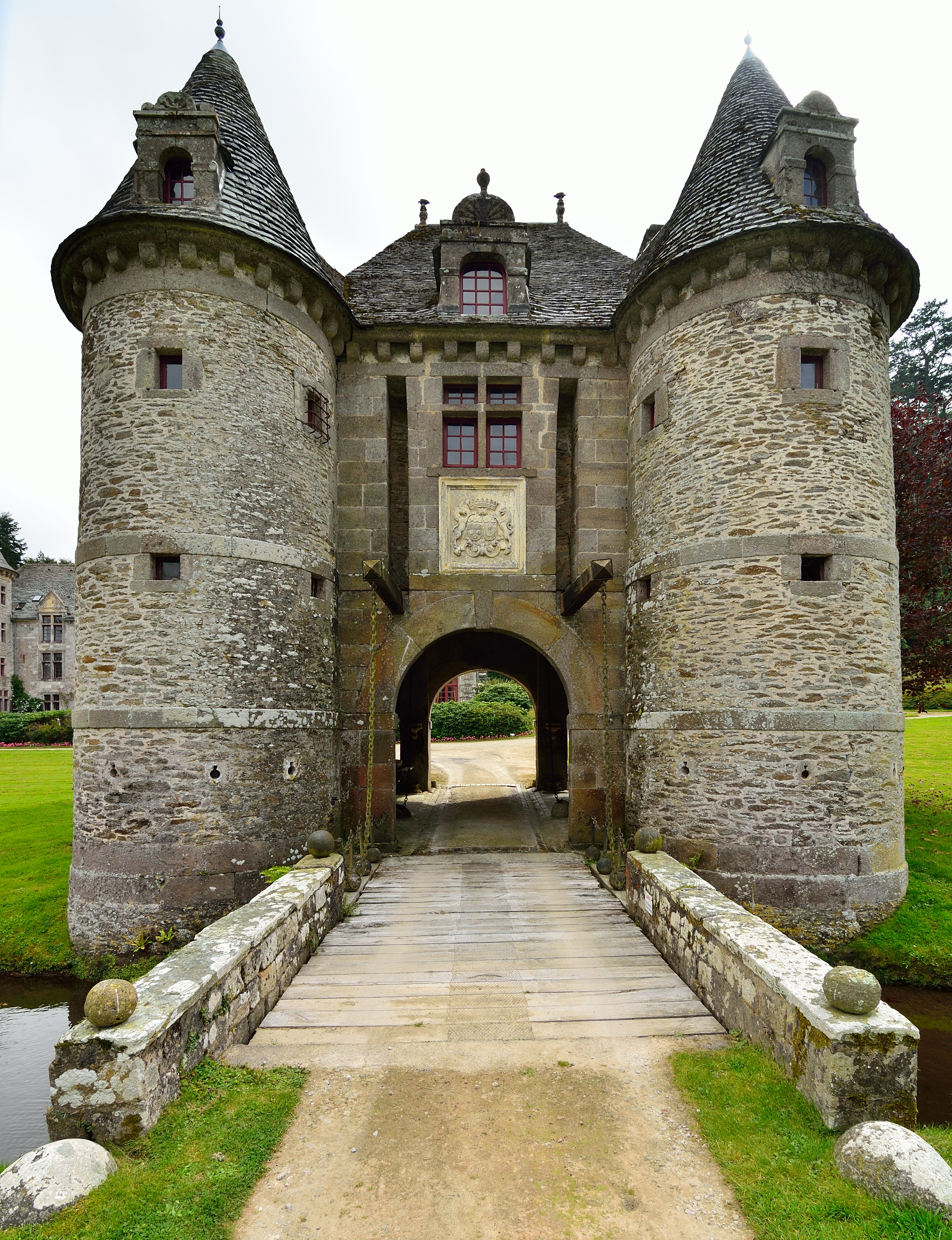
The gatehouse (poterne), the only surviving element of the medieval defensive enclosure

In 1689, the château was acquired by Bernardin Mangon des Marets, who the following year had the 6 m (20 ft) defensive enclosure demolished, keeping only the gatehouse (poterne), which remains the sole vestige of the fortifications, and added a pavilion to the residence, the right-hand part of the château. With the wall gone, a broad view over the valley opened up, and the building was transformed from a stronghold into an agreeable country house.

During the Seven Years' War, in the reign of Louis XV, the château was occupied by the English in August 1758, during the attack and sacking of Cherbourg. They had landed an army of some 12,000 men in the bay of Urville.

In 1794, during the French Revolution, the owner, Jean-Baptiste Barbout de Querqueville, sheltered Royalists in the château who were seeking to emigrate to England. He was arrested, brought before the Revolutionary Tribunal and presented to the Convention deputy Le Carpentier, before whom he died.

In 1826, Hippolyte Clérel de Tocqueville (1797–1877), the eldest brother of the writer Alexis de Tocqueville, inherited the château through his wife, Émilie Érard de Belisle de Saint-Rémy (1805–1870), and restored it, thereby becoming lord of Nacqueville. In 1830 he commissioned an English landscape designer to lay out a park over the three valleys converging on the château (see Park). The result so impressed Alexis de Tocqueville, author of Democracy in America, that in 1857 he wrote to his friend Gustave de Beaumont that his brother had spent much taste and money at Nacqueville and had made of it one of the prettiest places in the world.

=== The Hersent family ===
In 1877, on the death of Hippolyte de Tocqueville, the manor was bought by the engineer Hildevert Hersent (1827–1903), a president of the Society of Engineers of France, who modernised and refurnished the château and improved the water system of the park.

=== Second World War ===
During the Second World War the château was occupied first by German troops, who in 1943–1944 felled some 2,000 trees on the estate for the construction of the Atlantic Wall, and the site was turned into a barracks for members of the Hitler Youth. During the Battle of Normandy it was taken over by an American headquarters staff, and in 1945 some 60,000 prisoners were held in the park. The Americans selected 632 German prisoners of war for an education programme called "Project Sunflower" (Projet Tournesol), intended to train future leaders of a democratic Germany; it ran from 30 July to November 1945 in the château's courtyard, under tents. By the time the troops left, the estate was in a ruinous state.

=== Restoration and later owners ===
When Marcel Hersent (1895–1971) recovered the property in 1946, the whole place was in a catastrophic condition, with the roofs partly caved in, the interior ruined, the park devastated and the woods badly damaged. Over the following ten years he restored the château, park and farms, and in 1962 opened them to the public. On his death in 1971 his daughter Jacqueline, who had married François Azan, continued to maintain the estate. The storm of October 1987 felled trees over 25 ha (62 acres) of the park. In 2000 their daughter Florence inherited the property; with her husband, Thierry d'Harcourt, and their three children she returned from Australia to settle at Nacqueville. Florence d'Harcourt is the great-great-granddaughter of Hildevert Hersent.

== Description ==
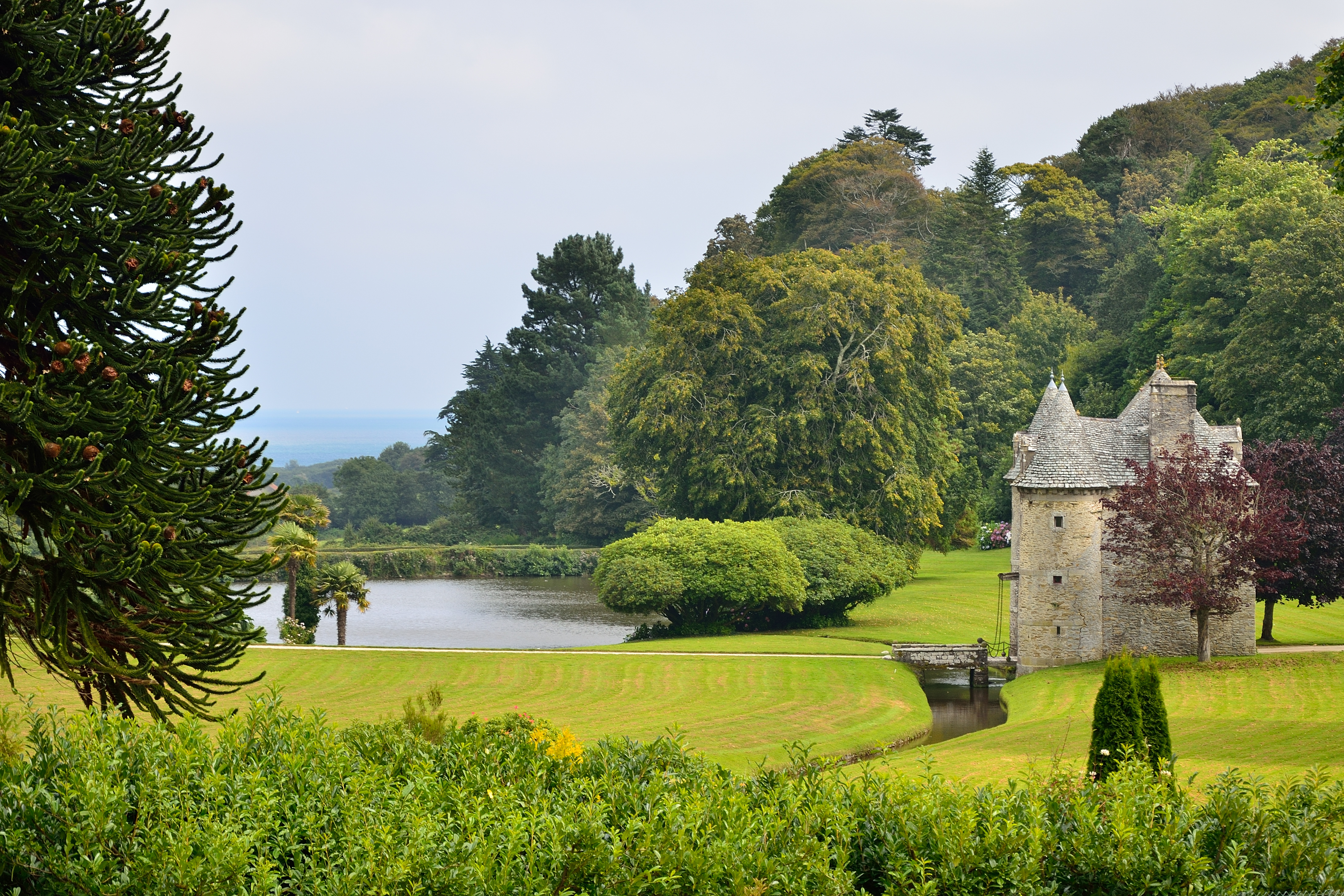
The château and its park

The château, built during the 16th century by three successive generations of the Grimouville family, was transformed in the 17th century and heavily restored at the end of the 19th century.

Of the medieval château there survives the gatehouse, now isolated from the rest of the building, flanked by two round towers with pepperpot roofs and linked by a long carriage porch surmounted by a large mullioned window. Between the still clearly visible grooves of the former drawbridge, preceded by the old moats, part of which still hold water, opens a central mullioned window, beneath which the Tocqueville couple carved their arms: argent, a fess sable accompanied in chief by three martlets sable and in base by three roundels azure, 2 and 1 for the Count of Tocqueville, and or, a stalk of three laurel leaves (or a trefoil) vert accompanied by three martlets sable, 2 in chief and 1 in base for his wife (1826), Émilie Érard de Belisle de Saint-Rémy (1805–1870).

The 16th-century logis, built in the Renaissance style, has a long main range flanked on its left by a round tower with a pepperpot roof, while on its right a pavilion extends the residence. One storey high, it is lit by 16th-century windows surmounted by tall dormers, remade in the 19th century in a style imitating the 16th century.

An inscription carved on the façade of the residence recalls the last offensive English landing in Normandy: "Les Anglais on dessendu le 7 d'aoust ano 1758" ("The English landed on 7 August in the year 1758").

Inside is a Renaissance fireplace with a double mantel and no hood, supported by consoles reinforced by two jambs in the form of engaged columns. On the first floor, the sculpted mantels are set between two square pillars, and on the second between two round colonnettes.

== Park ==
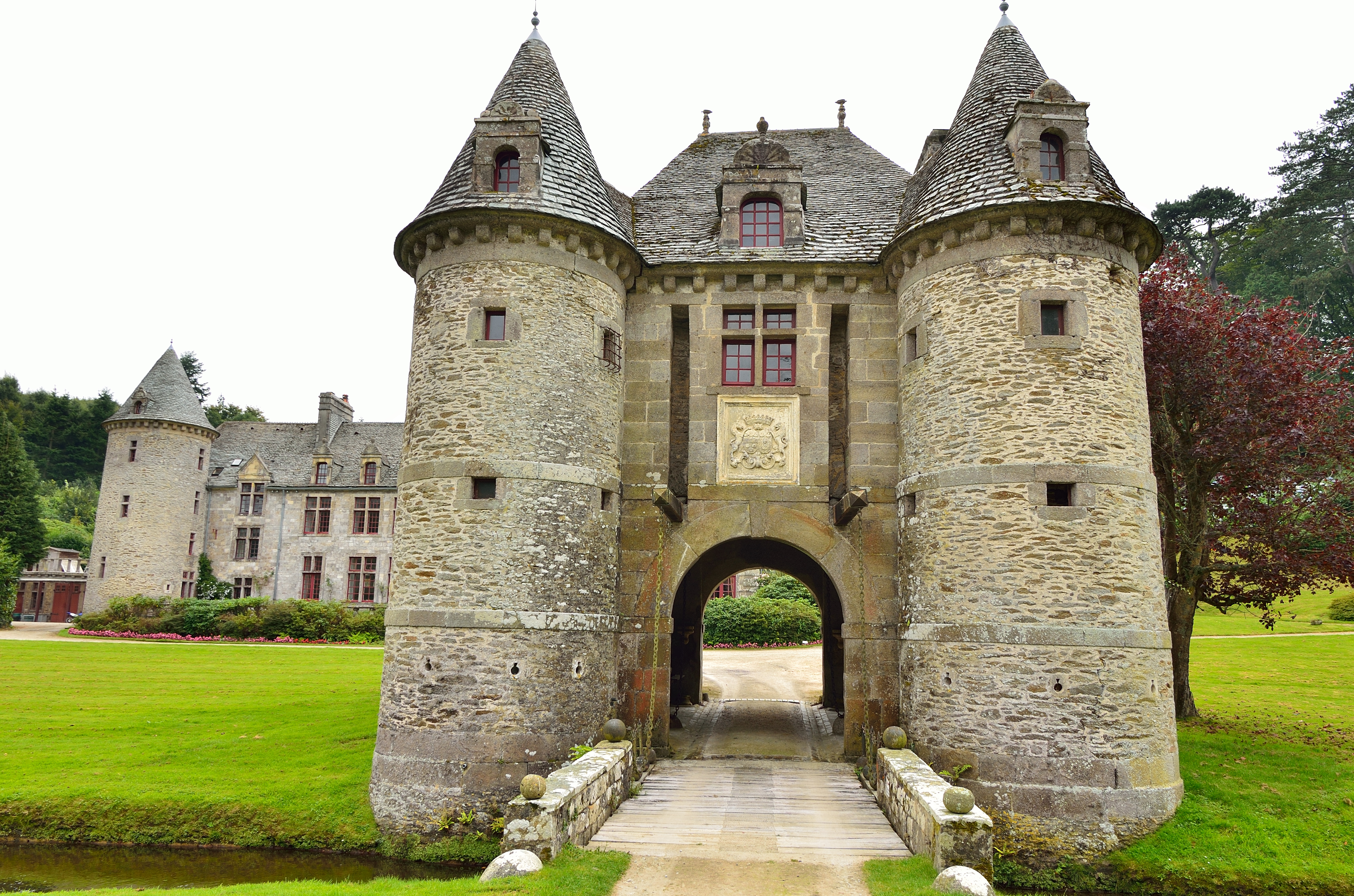
The landscape park, laid out around 1830

The English-style park was laid out around 1830 at the request of Count Hippolyte de Tocqueville, by an English landscape designer, and extends over 35 ha (86 acres). The designer conceived a romantic park across the three valleys around the château: he created a pond fed by the Castelets stream, laid out cascades and fountains, cleared the valley floor and planted ornamental trees, flowering shrubs and exotic species, rerouted the approach avenue to face the château, and extended the woods on the heights. Ponds, cascades and fountains are scattered among palm trees, gunneras and other exotic plants.

== Protection ==
As a Monument historique:

- the gate and its drawbridge were listed by decree of 16 May 1944;
- the façades and roofs of the château and the park, with all its hydraulic works, were listed by decree of 20 November 1992.

The park, covering 110 ha (270 acres), is a classified natural site by decree of 10 March 1969, and has held the Jardin remarquable label since 24 August 2020.

== Filming location ==
In July 1922, René Le Somptier, a Norman director, filmed the silent feature La Dame de Monsoreau, starring Gina Manès and Jean d'Yd, at the château. Some scenes were shot at the Château de Martinvast.

== Visiting ==
Only the park is open to visitors. The entrance hall of the château is open only during the Heritage Days, when Florence d'Harcourt receives visitors. The postern is also open to the public.

== See also ==
- List of castles in France

== Bibliography ==
- Barbaroux, Jean (1982). 120 Châteaux et Manoirs en Cotentin (in French). Bayeux: Éditions Heimdal. p. 79. ISBN 978-2-902-17157-6.
- Drouet, Louis (1899). "Le château de Nacqueville". La Normandie monumentale et pittoresque ... Manche (in French). Vol. Part 2. Le Havre: Lemasle & Cie. pp. 49–50.
- Hébert, Michel; Gervaise, André (2003). Châteaux et manoirs de la Manche (in French). Condé-sur-Noireau: Éditions Charles Corlet. pp. 133–134. ISBN 978-2-84706-143-7.
