= Canton of Beaumont-Hague =

Coordinates: 49°39′43″N 1°49′15″W

Beaumont-Hague
- Former canton
- Interactive map of Beaumont-Hague
- Country: France
- Region: Normandy
- Department: Manche
- No. of communes: {{{nbcomm}}}
- Disbanded: 2015
- Area: 148.68 km^{2} (57.41 sq mi)
- Population (2012): 11,932
  - Density: 80.253/km^{2} (207.85/sq mi)

The Canton of Beaumont-Hague in France is situated in the department of Manche and the region of Basse-Normandie. Its seat was the commune of Beaumont-Hague. It had 11,932 inhabitants (2012). It was disbanded following the French canton reorganisation which came into effect in March 2015. It consisted of 19 communes, which joined the new canton of La Hague in 2015.

The canton comprised the following communes:

- Acqueville
- Auderville
- Beaumont-Hague
- Biville
- Branville-Hague
- Digulleville
- Éculleville
- Flottemanville-Hague
- Gréville-Hague
- Herqueville
- Jobourg
- Omonville-la-Petite
- Omonville-la-Rogue
- Sainte-Croix-Hague
- Saint-Germain-des-Vaux
- Tonneville
- Urville-Nacqueville
- Vasteville
- Vauville
