= Tess (1979 film) =

1979 film by Roman Polanski

- Theatrical release poster
- Directed by: Roman Polanski
- Screenplay by: Gerard Brach; John Brownjohn; Roman Polanski
- Based on: Tess of the d'Urbervilles; 1891 novel by Thomas Hardy
- Produced by: Claude Berri
- Starring: Nastassja Kinski; Peter Firth; Leigh Lawson
- Cinematography: Ghislain Cloquet; Geoffrey Unsworth
- Edited by: Alastair McIntyre; Tom Priestley
- Music by: Philippe Sarde
- Production companies: Renn Productions; Timothy Burrill Productions; SFP
- Distributed by: Columbia-EMI-Warner Distributors (United Kingdom); AMLF (France)
- Release dates: 31 October 1979 (France); 9 April 1981 (United Kingdom)
- Running time: 172 minutes
- Countries: France; United Kingdom
- Language: English
- Budget: $12 million (est.)
- Box office: $20.1 million

Tess is a 1979 epic romantic drama film directed by Roman Polanski, and starring Nastassja Kinski, Peter Firth, and Leigh Lawson. Adapted from Thomas Hardy's 1891 novel Tess of the d'Urbervilles, the screenplay was written by Gérard Brach, John Brownjohn, and Polanski.

The film received positive reviews upon release and was nominated for six Academy Awards, including Best Picture, winning three for Best Cinematography, Best Art Direction and Best Costume Design.

== Plot ==
The story takes place in Thomas Hardy's Wessex during the 1880s.

The events of the story are set in motion when a clergyman, Parson Tringham, has a chance conversation with John Durbeyfield, a simple villager. Tringham is a local historian, and in the course of his research he has discovered the "Durbeyfields" are descended from the d'Urbervilles, a noble family whose lineage extends to the time of William the Conqueror. The family lost its land and prestige when the male heirs died out. The parson thinks Durbeyfield might like to know his origins as a passing historical curiosity.

Durbeyfield soon becomes fixated upon the idea of using his noble lineage to better his family's fortunes. Finding a wealthy family named d'Urberville living nearby, he and his wife send their daughter Tess to call on his presumed relations, and seek employment at the manor house. At the manor house live Alec d'Urberville and his mother. Tess is a beautiful girl, and Alec d'Urberville has an appetite for women. Alec and his mother know they are no relation to Tess, for their family name and coat of arms were purchased. Finding her naive, penniless and attractive, he sets about taking advantage of the situation. He tries to get her alone, and attempts to seduce her with strawberries and roses, but these efforts are parried by Tess. In time, he rapes her.

For a time they grow closer, but after four months at the manor Tess returns home, and soon discovers she is pregnant. She is angry with her mother for placing her at risk when she knows so little of the world's cruelty. The baby is born sickly and dies. Sometime later, Tess goes to a dairy farm to work as a milkmaid. She meets Angel Clare, an aspiring young farmer from a respectable family. He believes Tess to be an unspoiled country girl, and completely innocent. The two fall in love, and he proposes. Tess, realising she must tell him about her past, puts a note under his door. Angel acts as though nothing has happened, and only later does she realise that he has not seen the note. On their wedding night, after Angel has confessed to having had an affair, she feels able to tell him, but he is disillusioned by the news and abandons her.

Later, Tess meets Alec d'Urberville again. She at first angrily rebuffs his advances, but the death of her father puts the family in desperately hard times. Facing starvation, eviction and homelessness, Tess submits to Alec to support her mother and siblings. Shortly afterwards, Angel Clare returns from travelling abroad. A disastrous missionary tour in Brazil has ruined his health. Humbled, and having had plenty of time to think, he feels remorse for his treatment of Tess. He succeeds in tracking her down but leaves heartbroken when he finds her living with Alec. Tess realizes that going back to Alec has ruined her chances of happiness with Angel, and she murders Alec.

Running away to find Angel, Tess is reconciled with him; he can finally accept and embrace her as his wife without passing moral judgment on her actions. They consummate their marriage, spending two nights of happiness together on the run from the law before Tess is captured sleeping at Stonehenge. An ending summary tells that she is convicted and hanged for murder.

== Cast ==
- Nastassja Kinski as Tess Durbeyfield (listed as "Nastassia Kinski")
- Peter Firth as Angel Clare
- Leigh Lawson as Alec Stokes-d'Urberville
- John Collin as John Durbeyfield
- Rosemary Martin as Mrs. Durbeyfield
- Carolyn Pickles as Marian
- Richard Pearson as Vicar of Marlott
- David Markham as Reverend Clare
- Pascale de Boysson as Mrs. Clare
- Suzanna Hamilton as Izz Huett
- Caroline Embling as Retty
- Tony Church as Parson Tringham
- Sylvia Coleridge as Mrs. d'Urberville
- Fred Bryant as Dairyman Crick
- Tom Chadbon as Cuthbert Clare
- Arielle Dombasle as Mercy Chant
- Dicken Ashworth as Farmer Groby
- Lesley Dunlop as Girl in henhouse
- Graham Weston as Constable
- Marilyne Even as Girl in Henhouse #2
- John Barrett as Old Dairy hand
- Jacques Mathou as Harvester
- Patsy Smart as Housekeeper
- Jeanne Biras as Girl in Meadow #1
- Brigid Erin Bates as Girl in Meadow #2
- John Bett as Felix Clare

== Production ==
=== Development ===
Polanski was inspired to make the film by his wife Sharon Tate, who gave him a copy of Tess of the d'Urbervilles. She said it would make a great film and expressed interest in playing the part of Tess. It was the last time Polanski saw her alive, as she was departing back for America while he stayed on a while longer in Europe to finish working on a film. She was murdered by the Manson Family on 9 August 1969 while he was away. She was eight and a half months pregnant with their son, Paul Richard Polanski. The film is dedicated to her ("To Sharon") at the beginning.

=== Screenplay ===
Polanski wrote the screenplay in French with his usual collaborator Gérard Brach, then it was translated and expanded by John Brownjohn. The story line largely follows that of the book, although the role of Alec d'Urberville is toned down.

=== Filming ===
Set in Dorset, England, the film was shot at various locations in France: Normandy (Cotentin, la Hague, Omonville-la-Rogue, Éculleville, Sainte-Croix-Hague, le Vast, Bricquebec, Saint-Jacques-de-Néhou, Hermanville-sur-Mer), Brittany (Locronan, le Leslay, Plomelin), and Nord-Pas-de-Calais (Condette). Scenes were also shot at the château de Brocéliande in Paimpont. The megalithic site of Stonehenge was reconstructed in Morienval, a village located in Oise. Polanski was living in Europe as he was wanted as a fugitive after his conviction for sex with an underage girl in the United States. He had fled before sentencing and could have been extradited to the U.S. from the United Kingdom.

During the third month of shooting, on 28 October 1978, the cinematographer Geoffrey Unsworth died of a heart attack. Most of the scenes he had shot were exteriors that occur in the first half of the film. Ghislain Cloquet shot the remainder of the film, including most of the interior scenes. Both Unsworth and Cloquet were nominated and won an Academy Award for Best Cinematography. Cloquet alone was nominated for the César Award for Cinematography, which he won.

=== Music ===
The original musical score was composed by Philippe Sarde and orchestrated by Peter Knight. It was performed by the London Symphony Orchestra. The melody played by the character Angel Clare on a recorder is a popular Polish folk song "Laura i Filon".

=== Production notes ===
- Costumes for the film were designed by Anthony Powell. He received his third Academy Award for this work.
- Polanski intended the film to reflect an ancient peasant culture, which he had seen in Poland during World War II after fleeing the Kraków ghetto. The scenes also refer to the genre painting of the French artists Georges de La Tour of the 17th century and Gustave Courbet of the 19th century.

== Release ==
Tess was released in theaters in the United States on 12 December 1980. During its entire theatrical run, the film grossed little over US$20 million (equivalent to US$71 million in 2025) in the United States, which made it the 33rd highest-grossing film of 1980.

=== Alternate versions ===
The film premiered in France in 1979 at a length of 186 minutes. Polanski writes in his autobiography that he felt that the cut was incomplete, and rushed to meet the release date. The film premiered in 1980 in the U.S. at a re-edited length of 170 minutes. Later, overseas releases of the film in theaters and on home video ran as little as 136 minutes. The 170-minute cut is Polanski's approved version of the film. This version recently was restored in 4K from the original negative under Polanski's supervision, and he attended its premiere at the 2012 Cannes Film Festival.

== Reception ==
=== Critical response ===
On Rotten Tomatoes, the film has an approval rating of 81% based on reviews from 77 critics, with an average rating of 7.3/10 with the consensus: "A reverent adaptation of Thomas Hardy's novel, Tess marries painterly cinematography and unhurried pacing to create an epic ode to perseverance." On Metacritic, the film has a score of 82 out of 100 based on reviews from 15 critics, indicating "universal acclaim".

In a review in The New York Times, Janet Maslin described Tess as "a lovely, lyrical, unexpectedly delicate movie".

Roger Ebert of the Chicago Sun-Times gave the film four out of four stars and wrote: "This is a wonderful film; the kind of exploration of doomed young sexuality that, like Elvira Madigan, makes us agree that the lovers should never grow old." The film is one of Polanski's rare love stories, and is one of his most highly acclaimed works.

=== Accolades ===
Tess was nominated for six awards, including Best Picture, at the 53rd Academy Awards and won three. It was also nominated for four Golden Globe Awards (winning two), three British Academy Film Awards (winning one) and six César Awards (winning three).

Award	Category	Recipients	Result
53rd Academy Awards	Best Picture	Claude Berri	Nominated
53rd Academy Awards	Best Director	Roman Polanski	Nominated
53rd Academy Awards	Best Art Direction	Pierre Guffroy and Jack Stephens	Won
53rd Academy Awards	Best Cinematography	Geoffrey Unsworth and Ghislain Cloquet	Won
53rd Academy Awards	Best Costume Design	Anthony Powell	Won
53rd Academy Awards	Best Original Score	Philippe Sarde	Nominated
35th BAFTA Film Awards	Best Cinematography	Geoffrey Unsworth and Ghislain Cloquet	Won
35th BAFTA Film Awards	Best Production Design	Pierre Guffroy	Nominated
35th BAFTA Film Awards	Best Costume Design	Anthony Powell	Nominated
5th César Awards	Best Film	Roman Polanski	Won
5th César Awards	Best Director	Roman Polanski	Won
5th César Awards	Best Cinematography	Ghislain Cloquet	Won
5th César Awards	Best Actress	Nastassja Kinski	Nominated
5th César Awards	Best Production Design	Pierre Guffroy	Nominated
5th César Awards	Best Music Written for a Film	Philippe Sarde	Nominated
38th Golden Globe Awards	Best Director – Motion Picture	Roman Polanski	Nominated
38th Golden Globe Awards	Best Actress in a Motion Picture – Drama	Nastassja Kinski	Nominated
38th Golden Globe Awards	Best Foreign Film	France	Won
38th Golden Globe Awards	New Star of the Year – Female	Nastassja Kinski	Won
