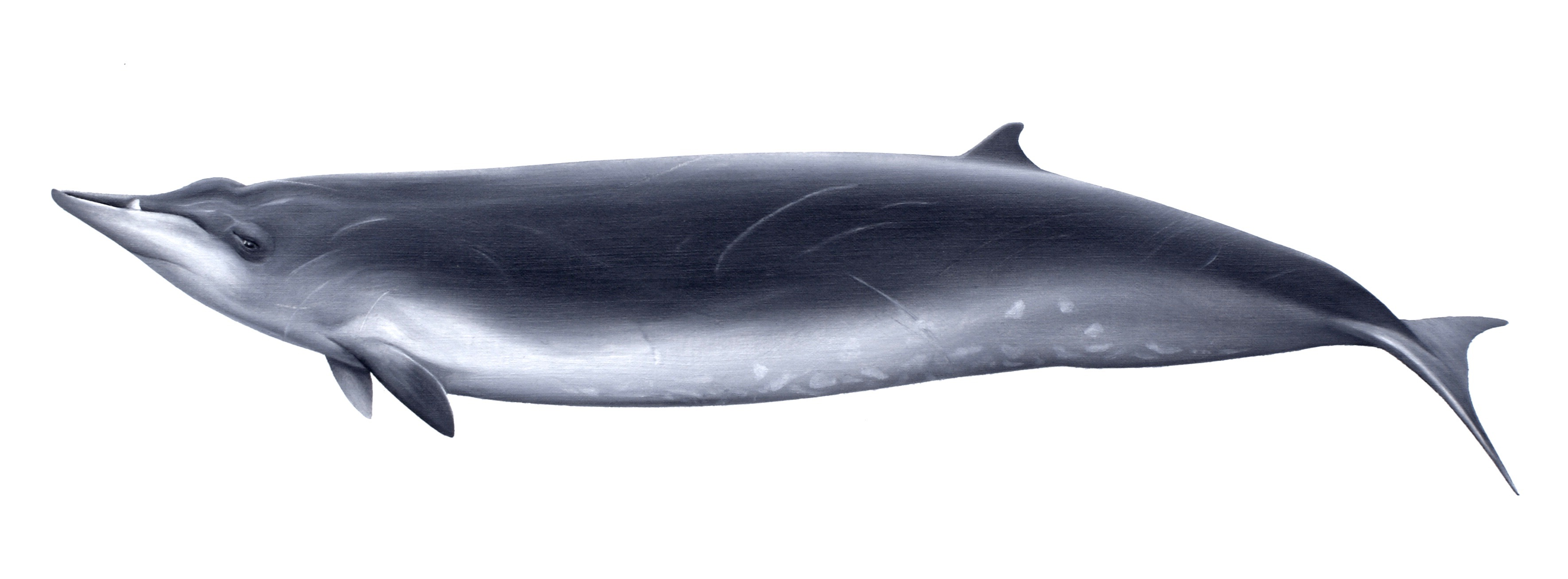

- Size compared to an average human

Conservation status
- Least Concern (IUCN 3.1)
- CITES Appendix II

Scientific classification
- Kingdom: Animalia
- Phylum: Chordata
- Class: Mammalia
- Infraclass: Placentalia
- Order: Artiodactyla
- Infraorder: Cetacea
- Family: Ziphiidae
- Genus: Mesoplodon
- Species: M. bidens

Binomial name
- Mesoplodon bidens Sowerby, 1804

= Sowerby's beaked whale =

Species of mammal

Sowerby's beaked whale (Mesoplodon bidens), also known as the North Atlantic or North Sea beaked whale, is a species of toothed whale. It was the first mesoplodont whale to be described. James Sowerby, an English naturalist and artist, first described the species in 1804 from a skull obtained from a male that had stranded in the Moray Firth, Scotland, in 1800. He named it bidens, which derives from the two teeth present in the jaw, now known to be a very common feature among the genus.

== Physical description ==
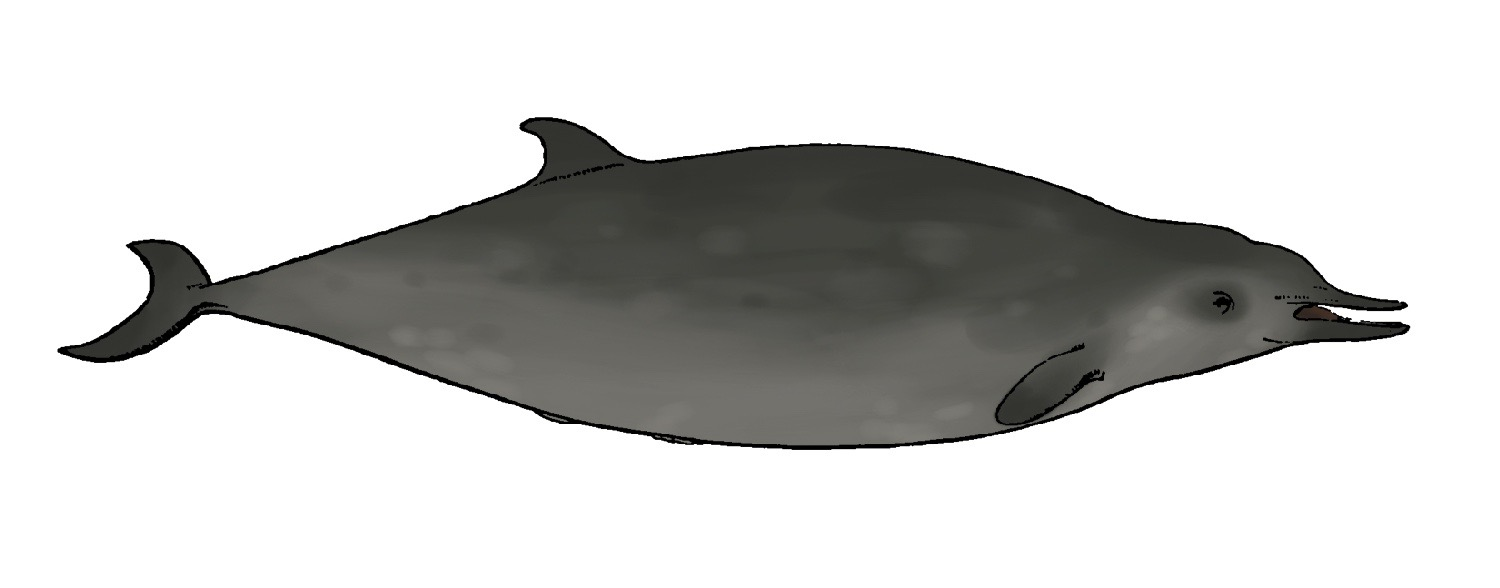
Profile of an adult female

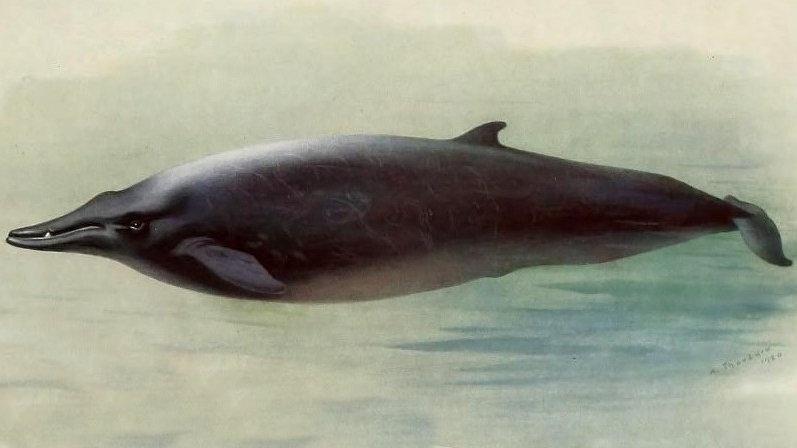
Adult male

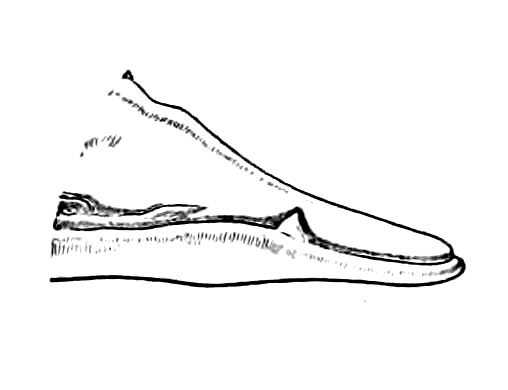
Adult male head, showing teeth

Sowerby's beaked whale has a typical body shape for the genus, and is mainly distinguished by the male's dual teeth positioned far back in the mouth. The whale's beak is moderately long, and the melon is slightly convex. The body pattern is dark grey above with light countershading on the bottom; it frequently has cookiecutter shark bites, and (in males) scars from teeth from fighting. The whale reaches 5 metres (16 ft) in females and 5.5 m (18 ft) in males, with a weight of 1,000–1,300 kg (2,200–2,900 lb).

== Population and distribution ==
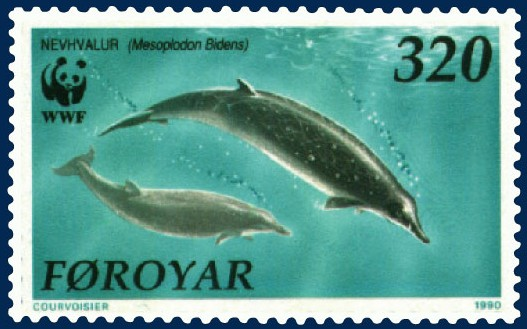
Sowerby's beaked whale on Faroese stamp

Sowerby's beaked whale ranges from Nantucket to Labrador in the western North Atlantic and from Madeira to the Norwegian Sea in the eastern North Atlantic. They typically range in waters 200 to 1,500 m (700 to 4,900 ft) deep. No population estimates have been made. In 1991, there were about 90 records of the species, 80 from the eastern North Atlantic and less than ten from the western North Atlantic; the majority of the records are from around the British Isles.

On 10 January 2009, a female Sowerby's beaked whale was found at the port of Fethiye on the Aegean coast of Turkey, far away from her natural habitat. The whale was successfully saved and released back to the open sea.

On 25 July 2015, biologists with the New England Aquarium investigated the death of a beaked whale in Massachusetts. The carcass of the 17 ft (5.2 m) long female, which weighed almost 1 short ton (0.91 t), was found on Plymouth Long Beach in Plymouth, Massachusetts. Biologists from the aquarium and the International Fund for Animal Welfare said they would perform a necropsy at the Woods Hole Oceanographic Institution. The whale was initially identified as a Sowerby's beaked whale, but the aquarium said a more thorough examination and consultation with additional experts was needed as staff had not seen a beaked whale since 2006.

On 26 October 2018, a 4.2 m (14 ft) whale was found beached near the town of Saltdean, on the UK coast. The carcass was subsequently taken to the Natural History Museum, London for post-mortem. On 29 August 2019, a stranded whale was rescued from Dungarvan Bay, in southeast Ireland. On 4 July 2020, a whale became disorientated and strayed into Wicklow harbour on the east coast of Ireland but was later discovered dead on Wicklow beach.

On 21 August 2020, a 3.86 m (12.7 ft) long female Sowerby's beaked whale washed up on the shore of a beach in Caister-on-Sea, Norfolk. Emergency services assisted the whale out to sea in an attempt to encourage the animal to live. Unfortunately the next morning a report was received to suggest the whale was stranded and deceased at Lowestoft, about 18 km south on the Suffolk coast, following reported sights of two whales in the nearby towns of Brancaster and Blakeney in Norfolk earlier in the month.

On successive days in October 2020, two Sowerby's beaked whales were washed up on separate beaches in East Lothian. Both animals died. The necropsy revealed that one of the whales had an unusually high density of small gas bubbles in the lung tissue, and both whales showed signs of gas emboli in the mesenteric arteries. These symptoms are often associated with decompression sickness, however it was not clear if this was the cause in this case. The MOD later revealed that, one day before the first whale stranded, airborne ASW sonar exercises had been carried out within 80 nmi (150 km; 92 mi) of the stranding sites. There was not enough evidence from the necropsy to confirm decompression sickness as the cause of death, so the Scottish Marine Animal Stranding Scheme still consider these as live strandings. However, given the otherwise good physical health of the beaked whales combined with the unusual proximity in both time and location of their strandings, the use of sonar in the surrounding area should still be considered a possible factor in the stranding.

On 28 September 2024, the bodies of two Sowerby's beaked whales, initially thought to be large dolphins, were sighted on a beach of near Éculleville, France on the Cotentin Peninsula. Before their bodies could be examined, they were pulled off the beach by the tide and washed up 50 km further down the coast off Biville, three days later. The whales were identified as an adult female and her young daughter. The local coast guard suggested that the adult became disoriented during a recent storm and ended up lost and unable to return to her usual swimming grounds and the daughter followed her to end up later beached, where both perished.

== Behaviour ==
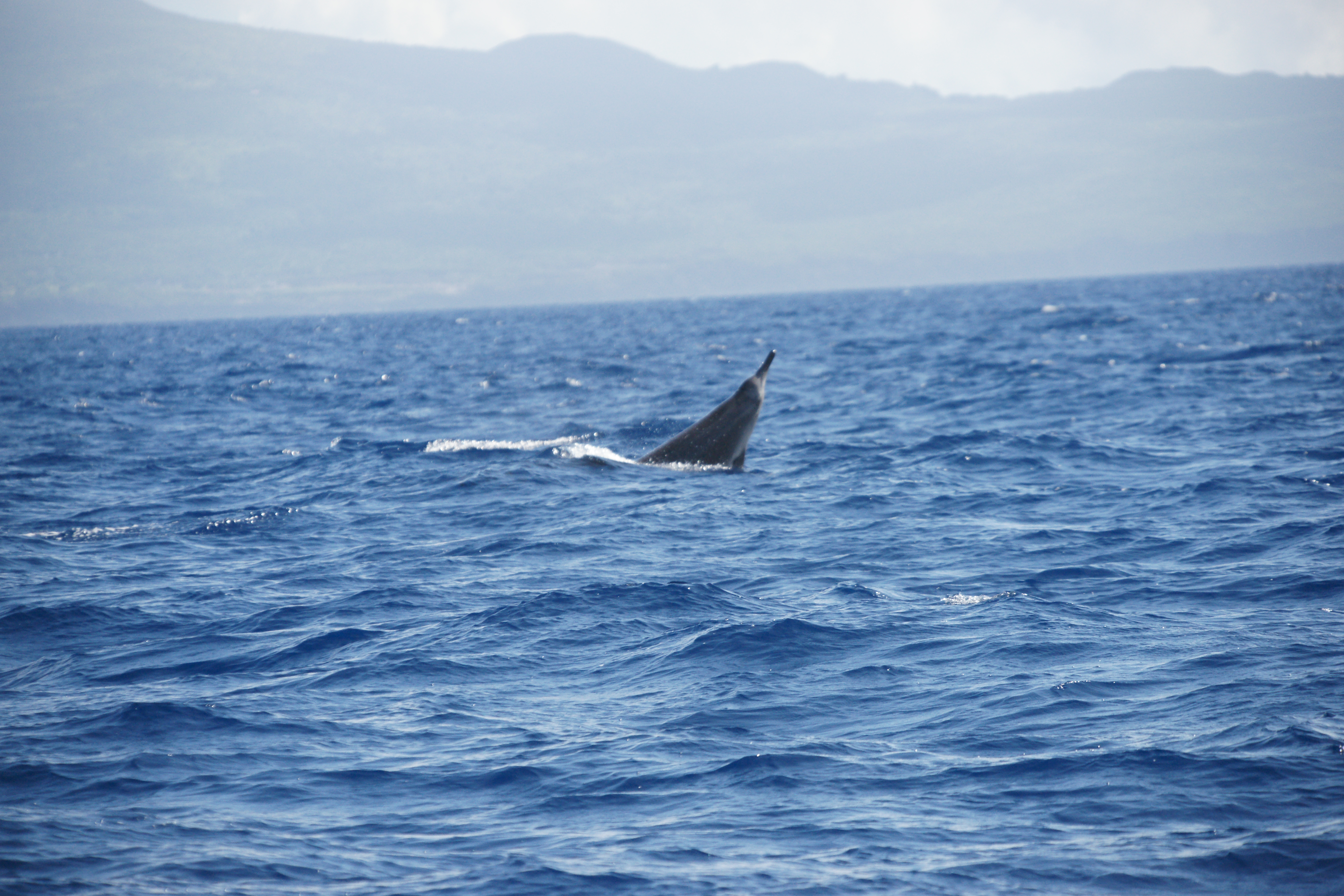
A whale breaching

=== Social behaviour ===
Sowerby's beaked whales are reclusive creatures that stay away from ships and are rarely sighted. The whales are occasionally seen in groups of up to ten individuals (males, females, and calves) and have been known to strand in groups as well.

=== Reproduction ===
One study from Norway suggests that mating may occur during late winter and spring. The gestation period is estimated to last approximately 12 months, and calves are born at a length of 2.1–2.7 m (6 ft 11 in – 8 ft 10 in) and a weight of around 185 kg (408 lb).

=== Food and foraging ===
Like other beaked whales, Sowerby's beaked whales possess a pair of V-shaped throat grooves that are thought to facilitate suction feeding by creating negative pressure within the mouth as the tongue retracts and the throat grooves expand, drawing prey inward powerfully, like a biological vacuum cleaner. The diet of this species consists primarily of small mesopelagic and benthopelagic fish, with cephalopods accounting for a much smaller proportion. Recorded prey include Merluccius sp., cod, hake, lanternfish (Diaphus sp., Electrona risso, Bolinichthys sp., Lampanyctus sp.), ridgeheads (Melamphaes sp., Poromitra capito), barrel-eye, pearleye, silvery pout, arrowtail, black cardinalfish, bristlemouth, Guttigadus latifrons, roundhead grenadier, barracudina, Taonius pavo, Discoteuthis laciniosa, and Histioteuthis meleagroteuthis.

=== Diving behaviour ===
They hunt at depths greater than 500 m (1,600 ft), and dive to more than 1,000 m (3,300 ft) while foraging. Their swimming and diving behaviour is more similar to deep-diving delphinids such as Risso's dolphins and pilot whales than to other mesoplodonts. Compared to Blainville's beaked whales, a mesoplodont of similar body size, Sowerby's beaked whales swim faster while descending and while actively foraging. Their dives are also relatively short and generally last between 30 and 40 minutes. Sowerby's beaked whales cover long distances between dives by swimming at speed just below the surface of the water, as opposed to the typical beaked whale strategy, where time near the surface is minimised by travelling on shallow dives at depths between 100 and 200 m (330 and 660 ft).

== Conservation ==
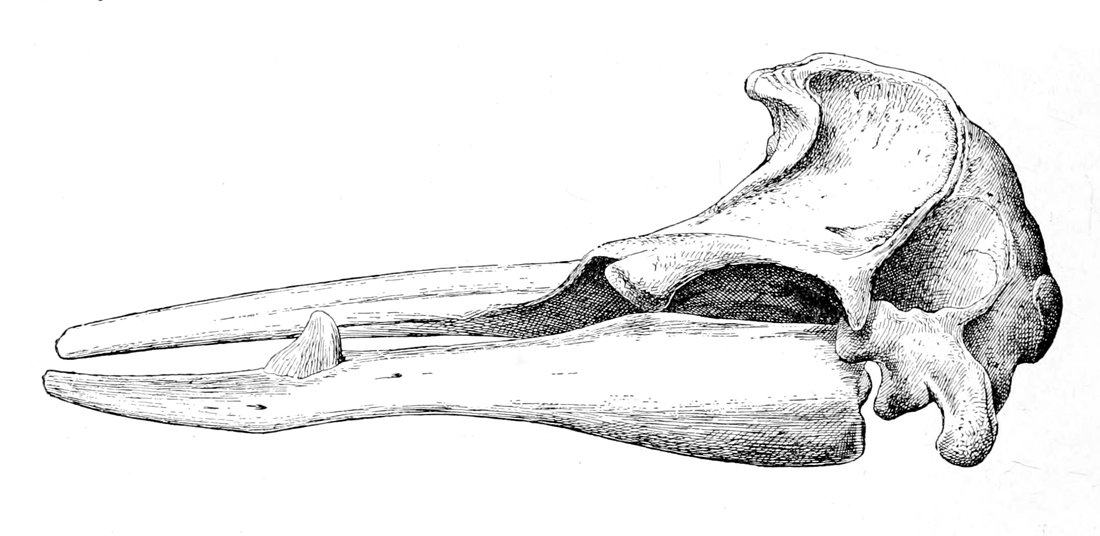
Skull of Sowerby's beaked whale

The species has been hunted infrequently by Norwegian whalers, but this has long since been abandoned. There are some deaths due to entanglement in fishing gear, but it is unlikely to be very damaging to the species. Sowerby's beaked whale is covered by the Agreement on the Conservation of Small Cetaceans of the Baltic, North East Atlantic, Irish and North Seas (ASCOBANS) and the Agreement on the Conservation of Cetaceans in the Black Sea, Mediterranean Sea and Contiguous Atlantic Area (ACCOBAMS). The species is further included in the Memorandum of Understanding Concerning the Conservation of the Manatee and Small Cetaceans of Western Africa and Macaronesia (Western African Aquatic Mammals MoU).

== See also ==
- List of cetaceans
