= Omonville (disambiguation) =

Omonville may refer to several communes in Normandy, France :

- Omonville, a commune of Seine-Maritime,
- Omonville-la-Petite, a commune in Manche
- Omonville-la-Rogue, a commune in Manche
- Le Tremblay-Omonville, a commune in Eure
- Omonville-la-Foliot, ou la-Folliot, a former commune in Manche, now part of Denneville

== See also ==
- Saint-Martin-Osmonville
