= Rosenblattichthys nemotoi =

Conservation status
- Data Deficient (IUCN 3.1)

Scientific classification
- Kingdom: Animalia
- Phylum: Chordata
- Class: Actinopterygii
- Order: Aulopiformes
- Family: Scopelarchidae
- Genus: Rosenblattichthys
- Species: R. nemotoi

Binomial name
- Rosenblattichthys nemotoi Okiyama & R. K. Johnson, 1986

Species of ray-finned fish

Rosenblattichthys nemotoi is a species of ray-finned fish in the pearleye family, Scopelarchidae. It is found in the eastern Indian Ocean.

== Description ==
This species reaches a length of 3.7 cm (1.5 in).

== Etymology ==
The fish is named in honor of Takahisa Nemoto (1930–1990), of the Ocean Research Institute, University of Tokyo, for his great contributions to the biology of the Antarctic, including his direction of the cruise during which the type specimen was collected.
