= Rosenblattichthys volucris =

Conservation status
- Least Concern (IUCN 3.1)

Scientific classification
- Kingdom: Animalia
- Phylum: Chordata
- Class: Actinopterygii
- Order: Aulopiformes
- Family: Scopelarchidae
- Genus: Rosenblattichthys
- Species: R. volucris

Binomial name
- Rosenblattichthys volucris (Rofen, 1966)

Synonyms
- Phanops volucris Rofen, 1966

Species of ray-finned fish

Rosenblattichthys volucris, the chubby pearleye, is a species of pearleye found in the Pacific Ocean.
