= Benthalbella linguidens =

Conservation status
- Least Concern (IUCN 3.1)

Scientific classification
- Kingdom: Animalia
- Phylum: Chordata
- Class: Actinopterygii
- Order: Aulopiformes
- Family: Scopelarchidae
- Genus: Benthalbella
- Species: B. linguidens

Binomial name
- Benthalbella linguidens (Mead & J. E. Böhlke, 1953)

Species of ray-finned fish

Benthalbella linguidens, the longfin pearleye, is a species of ray-finned fish that can be found in the North Pacific from Japan to California. It is a member of Benthalbella, a genus of pearleyes.

== Size ==
This species reaches a max length in excess of 30 cm (12 in).

== Biology ==
Most often found between 50 and 300 m (160 and 980 ft) during both day and night. They exhibit diel vertical migration, and individuals commonly migrate to 50 m (160 ft) or shallower during nighttime. Diet depends on life stage, with juveniles feeding on crustaceans while adults mainly feeding on other fish.
