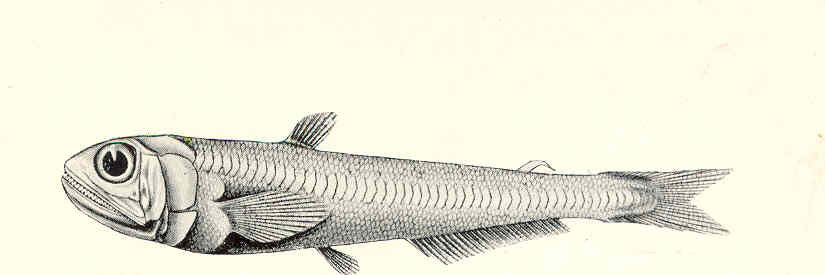

Conservation status
- Least Concern (IUCN 3.1)

Scientific classification
- Kingdom: Animalia
- Phylum: Chordata
- Class: Actinopterygii
- Order: Aulopiformes
- Family: Scopelarchidae
- Genus: Scopelarchus
- Species: S. guentheri

Binomial name
- Scopelarchus guentheri Alcock, 1896

= Scopelarchus guentheri =

Species of ray-finned fish

Scopelarchus guentheri, commonly known as the staring pearleye, is a mesopelagic ray-finned fish known for its unique visual system consisting of two retinas in each eye as well as a distinctive 'pearl organ' found inside each eye. Like other members of the genus Scopelarchus, S. guentheri has an opaque colored body.

== Distribution ==
Scopelarchus guentheri can be found in the Atlantic, Pacific, and Indian Oceans. Within the North Atlantic, S. guentheri has only been found in the Caribbean Sea, and throughout the entire Atlantic Ocean it is thought that S. guentheri lives primarily in tropical and subtropical waters. In the Pacific Ocean, S. guentheri can most commonly be found in warm waters, however there is evidence suggesting that S. guentheri is most common in the Pacific Ocean in areas peripheral to the equator, clear of the intersection between the North Pacific Gyre and South Pacific Gyre. In the Atlantic and Indian Oceans, S. guentheri has only been found between the latitudes 20°N and 30°S, although the highest concentrations are between 10°N and 10°S. In the Pacific Ocean, S. guentheri has been found between 35°N and 50°S. S. guentheri undergoes diel vertical migration; specimens have been found between depths of 500-1000m during the day and 150m at night. Additionally, larvae have been found closer to the water surface, limited to depths of 0-100m.

== Biology ==
Scopelarchus guentheri is anatomically characterized by having 6-7 dorsal soft rays, 24-29 anal soft rays, 46-51 vertebrae, and pigmentation found exclusively in dorsal and ventral stripes to the lateral line. The visual system of S. guentheri has been studied via optical and electron microscope, where the retina of the species was described. The main retina of S. guentheri can be distinctly broken down into the anterior and posterior regions; the anterior region is characterized by a uniform distribution of rods anchored to an unspecialized pigment epithelium while the posterior region is characterized by bundles of rods bound by tight junctions. The secondary retina, known as the accessory retina, is similar in structure to the posterior region of the main retina and is characterized by bundles of rods, although the bundles are irregular in the accessory retina. The posterior region of the main retina is especially striking due to the symmetry of the rod bundles, and the pigment cells of S. guentheri are triangular in shape, which is distinct from the commonly polygonal shape of other teleost's pigment cells.
