= Rosenblattichthys hubbsi =

Conservation status
- Least Concern (IUCN 3.1)

Scientific classification
- Kingdom: Animalia
- Phylum: Chordata
- Class: Actinopterygii
- Order: Aulopiformes
- Family: Scopelarchidae
- Genus: Rosenblattichthys
- Species: R. hubbsi

Binomial name
- Rosenblattichthys hubbsi R. K. Johnson, 1974

Species of ray-finned fish

Rosenblattichthys hubbsi, also known as Hubb's pearleye, is a species of ray-finned fish in the pearleye family, Scopelarchidae. It is found worldwide.

== Description ==
This species reaches a length of 14.5 cm (5.7 in).

== Etymology ==
The fish is named in honor of ichthyologist Carl L. Hubbs (1894-1979), for his many contributions to the science of ichthyology.
