= Scopelarchus analis =

Conservation status
- Least Concern (IUCN 3.1)

Scientific classification
- Kingdom: Animalia
- Phylum: Chordata
- Class: Actinopterygii
- Order: Aulopiformes
- Family: Scopelarchidae
- Genus: Scopelarchus
- Species: S. analis

Binomial name
- Scopelarchus analis (Brauer, 1902)

Synonyms
- Dissomma anale Brauer, 1902

Species of ray-finned fish

Scopelarchus analis, the short fin pearleye or blackbelly pearleye, is a species of ray-finned fish that can be found circumglobal in warm waters. It is a member of the Scopelarchus, a genus of pearleyes.

== Size ==
This species reaches a max length of 12.6 cm (4.96 in).

== Biology ==
It has a unique cylindrical eye that it is directed dorsally. This allows the fish to gain a binocular view of the water column above. The fish also possesses a unique adaptation where it has multiple retinae. The primary retina is located at the base of the cylinder, an accessory retina along the nasal wall, and between the two is a retinal diverticulum.
