= Thomas Hélye =

Blessed Thomas Hélye
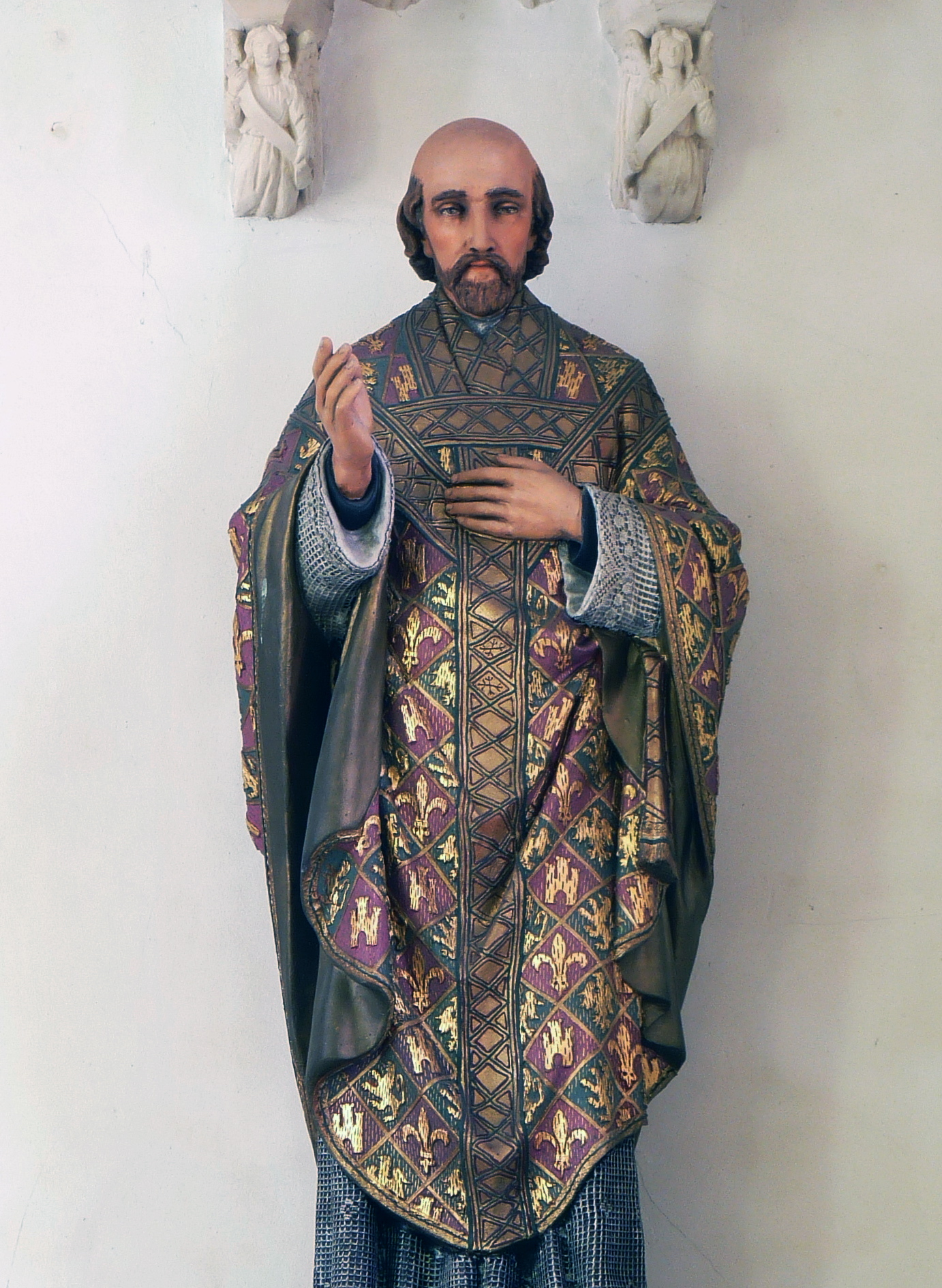
- Statue of Bl. Thomas Hélye in polychrome plaster (late 19th c.), in the Church of Saint-Pierre, Biville

Priest
- Born: 1187; Biville, Normandy, France
- Died: October 19, 1257; Vauville, Normandy, France
- Venerated in: Catholic Church
- Beatified: 1859 by Pope Pius IX
- Major shrine: Church of Saint-Pierre, Biville
- Feast: October 19

Thomas Hélye (Thomas Helias; 1187 – 19 October 1257), also known as Thomas of Biville, was a Norman Catholic priest, teacher, and preacher known for his austere life and dedication to catechesis. His cult as a beatus was confirmed by Pope Pius IX in 1859, and his feast is celebrated on 19 October.

== Life ==
Thomas was born in Biville, a coastal village in Normandy, then part of the Diocese of Coutances. His parents, Elias and Mathilda, appear to have held some local importance—though Thomas's Latin vita describes them as "simple" (simplices)—and at his mother's urging, he was sent to school.

As a young man, Thomas became a village schoolmaster and catechist in Biville. The good results of his teaching attracted attention in Cherbourg, where he was invited to instruct the children. He continued in this role until illness forced him to return home. After recovering, Thomas adopted a lay monastic style of life at his father’s home. Known for his piety, he was ordained a deacon by the bishop of Coutances, and eventually undertook pilgrimages to "the thresholds of the blessed apostles Peter, Paul, and James," that is, to Santiago de Compostela and Rome. Following these, he studied theology at the University of Paris for four years before being ordained a priest.

He began his ministry at the Church of Saint-Maurice in Biville but seems to have preferred pastoral and missionary work over administrative duties. He continued his former ministry of preaching, catechizing, and tending the sick, as well as exhorting the indifferent and assisting the poor. His travels took him not only throughout Coutances, but also to the dioceses of Avranches, Bayeux, and Lisieux. Known for his austerity, he was esteemed locally for his charity, innocence, and asceticism, and was widely venerated as a wonderworker.

In the final years of his life, according to his vita, Thomas endured recurring illness. When he was unable to attend mass, he arranged for the bell to be rung at key moments and received Holy Communion with solemn ceremony, assisted by clerics and vested in liturgical garments.

== Death and veneration ==
Thomas fell ill at Vauville and died on 19 October 1257, "on a Friday, the day after the feast of Saint Luke the Evangelist, around the ninth hour." According to tradition, the first miracle after his death was the healing of the withered hand of his hostess. He was buried in Biville, first in the cemetery and then in the church itself, and his tomb quickly became a site of popular devotion.

During the French Revolution, the church was desecrated and his tomb repurposed as a desk. In 1794, the vicar general of Coutances secretly led an effort to recover the relics. The largely intact skeleton was exhumed, reinterred in a concealed location at the nearby church of Virandeville, and accompanied by an affidavit. Revolutionary authorities were unable to identify those responsible. The relics were solemnly returned to Biville in 1803, where they remain enshrined today.

Although not formally canonized, Thomas was venerated as a "blessed" for centuries in Normandy. His cult was confirmed by Pope Pius IX in 1859.

In the modern Roman Martyrology, Thomas is commemorated with the following entry on October 19:

Bivíllæ prope Cǽsaris Burgum in Normánnia, beáti Thomæ Hélye, presbýteri, qui dies in sacro ministério, noctes vero in oratióne et pæniténtia impendébat.

At Biville near Cherbourg-en-Cotentin in Normandy, the blessed Thomas Hélye, priest, who spent his days in sacred ministry and his nights in prayer and penance.

== Hagiography ==
The principal source for the life of Thomas Hélye is a Latin biography written by a cleric named Clement, a contemporary who had known him personally and witnessed many of the events he described. Four years after Thomas’s death, an ecclesiastical inquiry into his virtues and reputed miracles was held in which Clement participated. His account, based on depositions from that investigation, forms the basis of later traditions concerning Thomas’s sanctity. This text is printed in the Acta Sanctorum, augmented by sources including the Martyrologium Gallicanum and writings by Andreas Saussayus, and was also edited separately by Léopold Delisle in the Mémoires de la Société Académique de Cherbourg.

Later biographies were composed by Louis Couppey (1903) and Louis-Charles Pinel (1927), expanding upon Clement’s foundational vita. Though some hagiographical accounts claimed that Thomas served as chaplain to Louis IX, this is not supported by historical evidence. The Bollandist François van Ortroy specifically disputed this attribution in the 1903 Analecta Bollandiana.

== Bibliography ==
- Acta Sanctorum Octobris, Tomus VIII. Brussels: Typis Alphonsi Greuse. 1853. pp. 592–622.
- Butler, Alban (1956). Thurston, Herbert; Attwater, Donald (eds.). The Lives of the Saints. Vol. 4 (rev. ed.). New York: P. J. Kenedy & Sons. pp. 151–152.
- Hofer, J.; Rahner, K., eds. (1957–1965). "Thomas Hélye". Lexikon für Theologie und Kirche (2nd ed.). Freiburg.
- Lazenby, F. D., ed. (2003). "Thomas Hélye, Bl.". New Catholic Encyclopedia. Vol. 14 (2nd ed.). Detroit: Gale.
- Mercati, A.; Pelzer, A., eds. (1954–1958). Dizionario ecclesiastico. Vol. 3. Turin: Unione Tipografico-Editrice Torinese. p. 1148.
- "Thomas Hélye". Analecta Bollandiana. 22: 505. 1903.
