= Herqueville =

Herqueville may refer to several communes in Normandy, France:

- Herqueville, Eure
- Herqueville, Manche
- Heugueville-sur-Sienne, in the Manche département
