= Rosenblattichthys alatus =

Conservation status
- Least Concern (IUCN 3.1)

Scientific classification
- Kingdom: Animalia
- Phylum: Chordata
- Class: Actinopterygii
- Order: Aulopiformes
- Family: Scopelarchidae
- Genus: Rosenblattichthys
- Species: R. alatus

Binomial name
- Rosenblattichthys alatus (Fourmanoir, 1970)

Synonyms
- Benthalbella alatus Fourmanoir, 1970

Species of ray-finned fish

Rosenblattichthys alatus, the winged pearleye, is a species of pearleye found in the tropical waters of the Indo-Pacific.

== Description ==
This species reaches a length of 8.0 cm (3.1 in).
