= Vasteville =

- Part of La Hague
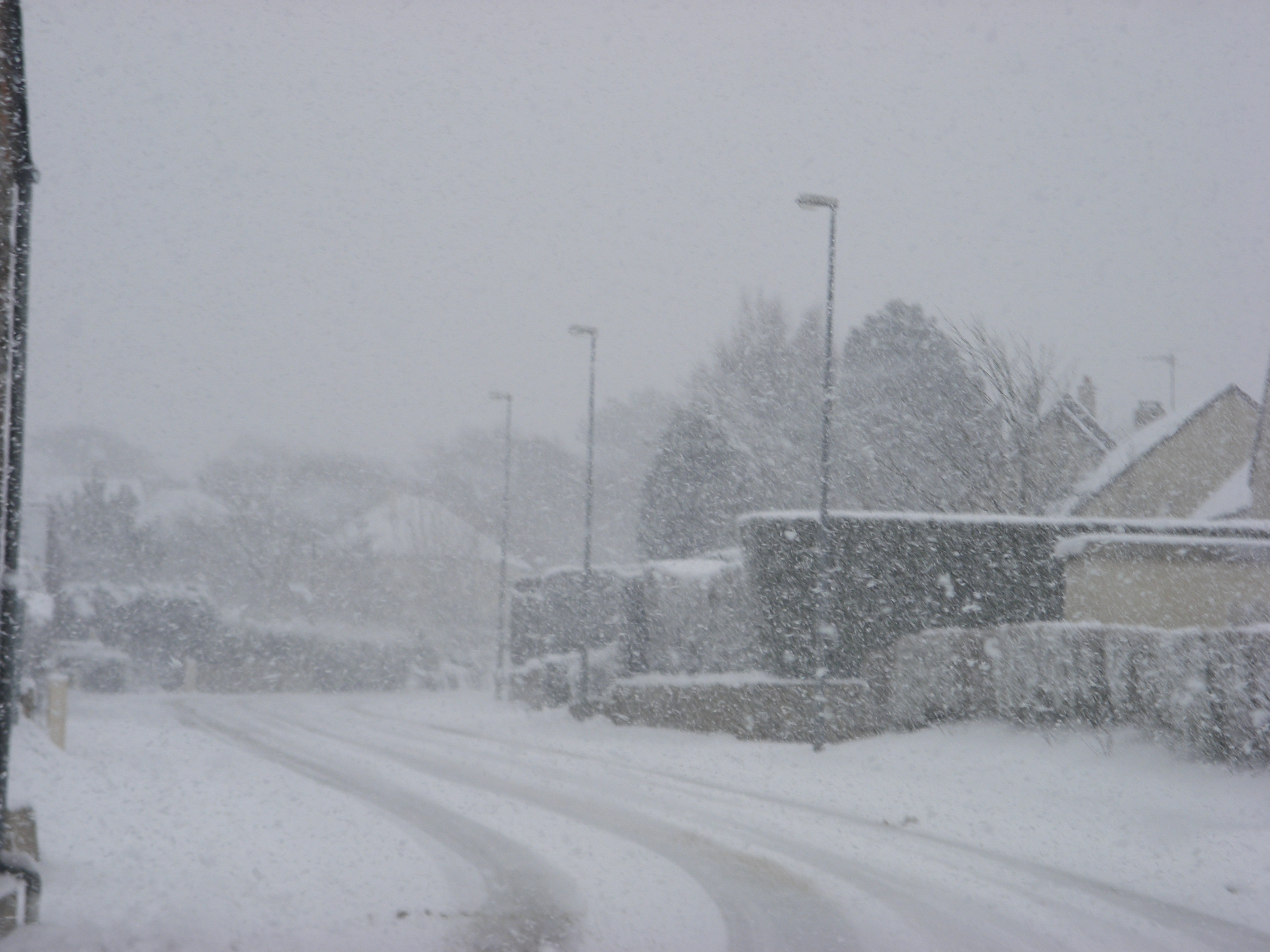
- Location of Vasteville
- Location within France Location within Normandy
- Coordinates: 49°35′43″N 1°46′19″W
- Country: France
- Region: Normandy
- Department: Manche
- Arrondissement: Cherbourg
- Canton: La Hague
- Commune: La Hague
- Area^{1}: 16.72 km^{2} (6.46 sq mi)
- Elevation: 109 m (358 ft)
- Highest elevation: 175 m (574 ft)
- Lowest elevation: 3 m (9.8 ft)
- Population (2022): 1,220
  - Density: 73.0/km^{2} (189/sq mi)
- Demonym: Vastevillais
- Time zone: UTC+01:00 (CET)
  - Summer (DST): UTC+02:00 (CEST)
- Postal code: 50440
- ^{1} French Land Register data, which excludes lakes, ponds, glaciers > 1 km^{2} (0.386 sq mi or 247 acres) and river estuaries.

Vasteville (French pronunciation: [vaːtvil]) is a former commune in the Manche department in Normandy in north-western France. On 1 January 2017, it was merged into the new commune La Hague.

== See also ==
- Communes of the Manche department
