= Digulleville =

- Part of La Hague
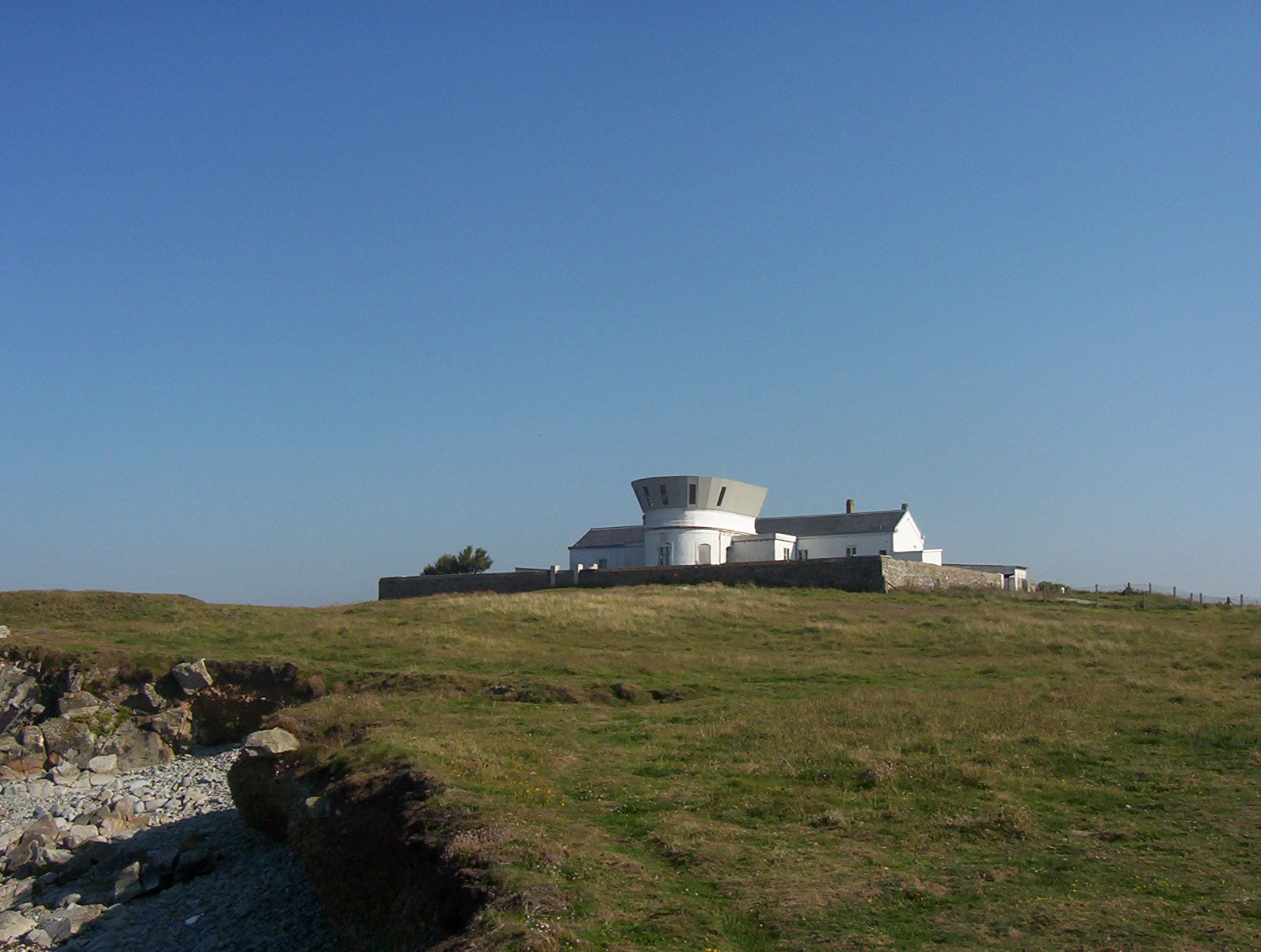
- Jardeheu semaphore station, on Jardeheu point, bought by the town in 2005
- Location of Digulleville
- Location within France Location within Normandy
- Coordinates: 49°42′00″N 1°52′00″W
- Country: France
- Region: Normandy
- Department: Manche
- Arrondissement: Cherbourg
- Canton: La Hague
- Commune: La Hague
- Area^{1}: 7.89 km^{2} (3.05 sq mi)
- Elevation: 70 m (230 ft)
- Highest elevation: 182 m (597 ft)
- Lowest elevation: 0 m (0 ft)
- Population (2022): 261
  - Density: 33.1/km^{2} (85.7/sq mi)
- Demonym: Digullevillais(es)
- Time zone: UTC+01:00 (CET)
  - Summer (DST): UTC+02:00 (CEST)
- Postal code: 50440
- Website: www.digulleville.fr
- ^{1} French Land Register data, which excludes lakes, ponds, glaciers > 1 km^{2} (0.386 sq mi or 247 acres) and river estuaries.

Digulleville (French pronunciation: [diɡylvil]) is a former commune in the Manche department in north-western France. On 1 January 2017, it was merged into the new commune La Hague.

== See also ==
- Communes of the Manche department
