= Auderville =

- Part of La Hague
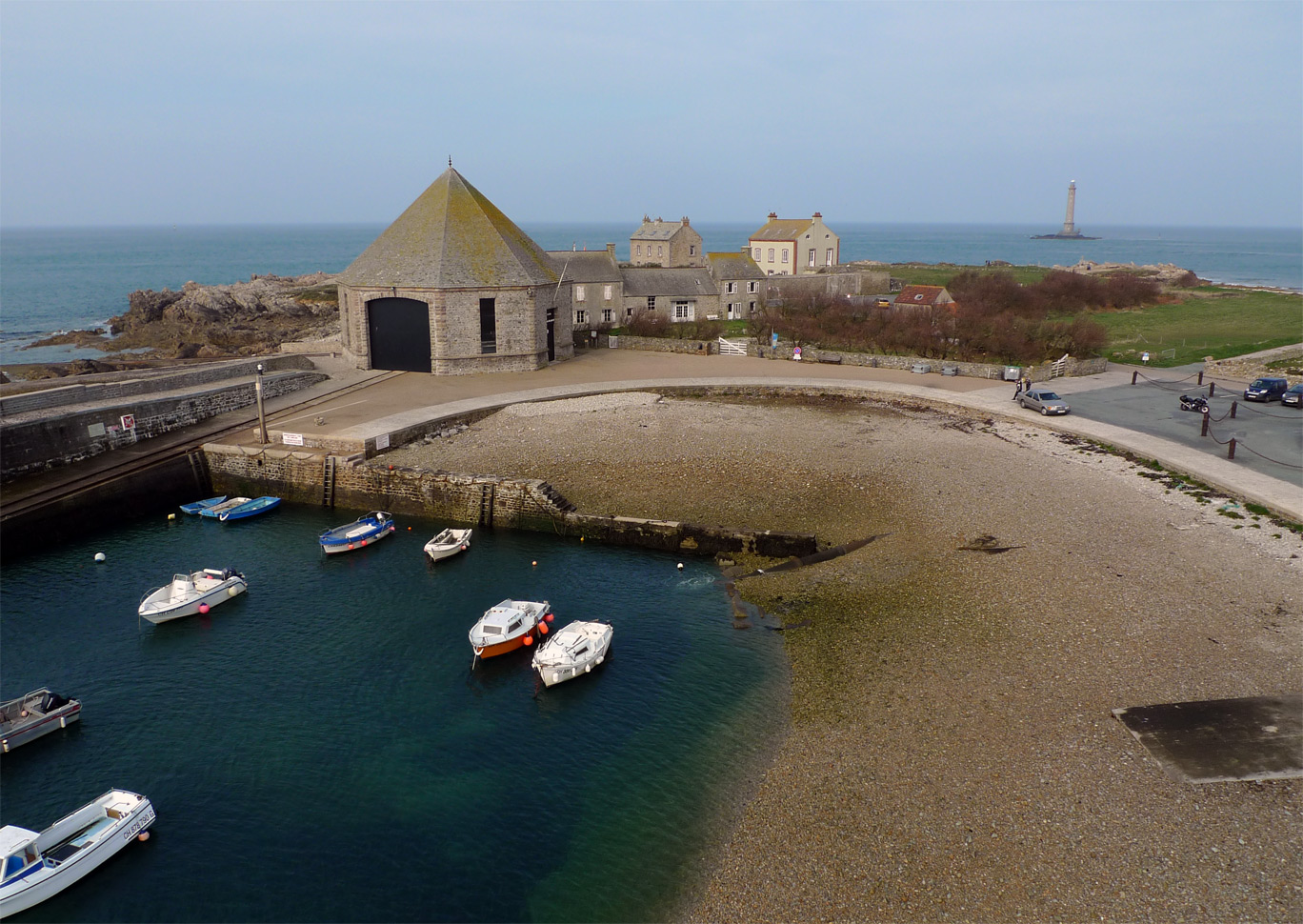
- The port
- Location of Auderville
- Location within France Location within Normandy
- Coordinates: 49°42′46″N 1°55′48″W
- Country: France
- Region: Normandy
- Department: Manche
- Arrondissement: Cherbourg
- Canton: La Hague
- Commune: La Hague
- Area^{1}: 4.33 km^{2} (1.67 sq mi)
- Elevation: 60 m (200 ft)
- Highest elevation: 133 m (436 ft)
- Lowest elevation: 0 m (0 ft)
- Population (2023): 237
  - Density: 54.7/km^{2} (142/sq mi)
- Time zone: UTC+01:00 (CET)
  - Summer (DST): UTC+02:00 (CEST)
- Postal code: 50440
- ^{1} French Land Register data, which excludes lakes, ponds, glaciers > 1 km^{2} (0.386 sq mi or 247 acres) and river estuaries.

Auderville (French pronunciation: [odɛʁvil]) is a former commune on the north coast of the Manche department in the Normandy region in northwestern France. On 1 January 2017, it was merged into the new commune La Hague.

== History ==
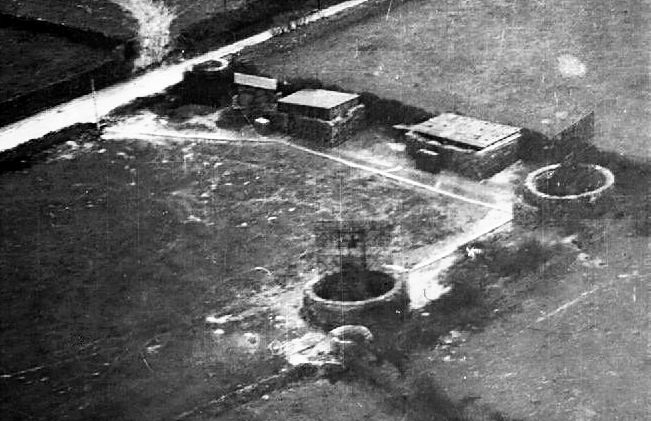
Freya radar spotted on 22 February 1941

On 22 February 1941, an RAF reconnaissance Spitfire aircraft from RAF Benson in south Oxfordshire with Flying Officer William Kenneth Manifould (28 June 1918 - 10 April 1941) of No. 1 Photographic Reconnaissance Unit RAF spotted the Freya radar nearby.

== Geography ==
The commune contains four villages, Goury, Laye, La Valette and La Roche, as well as a lighthouse. It is separated from Alderney by the Raz Blanchard, and has a small and not easily accessible port at Goury.

Cadomian granit crop out in Auderville.

== Heraldry ==
Arms of Auderville	The arms of Auderville are blazoned : Argent, on a fess gules in pale 2 leopards between 2 buckles Or, in chief a fleur de lys between 2 mullets, and in base a lighthouse between 2 ermine spots sable, the lighthouse pierced of the field and lit Or.

== See also ==
- Communes of the Manche department
