= Gréville-Hague =

- Part of La Hague
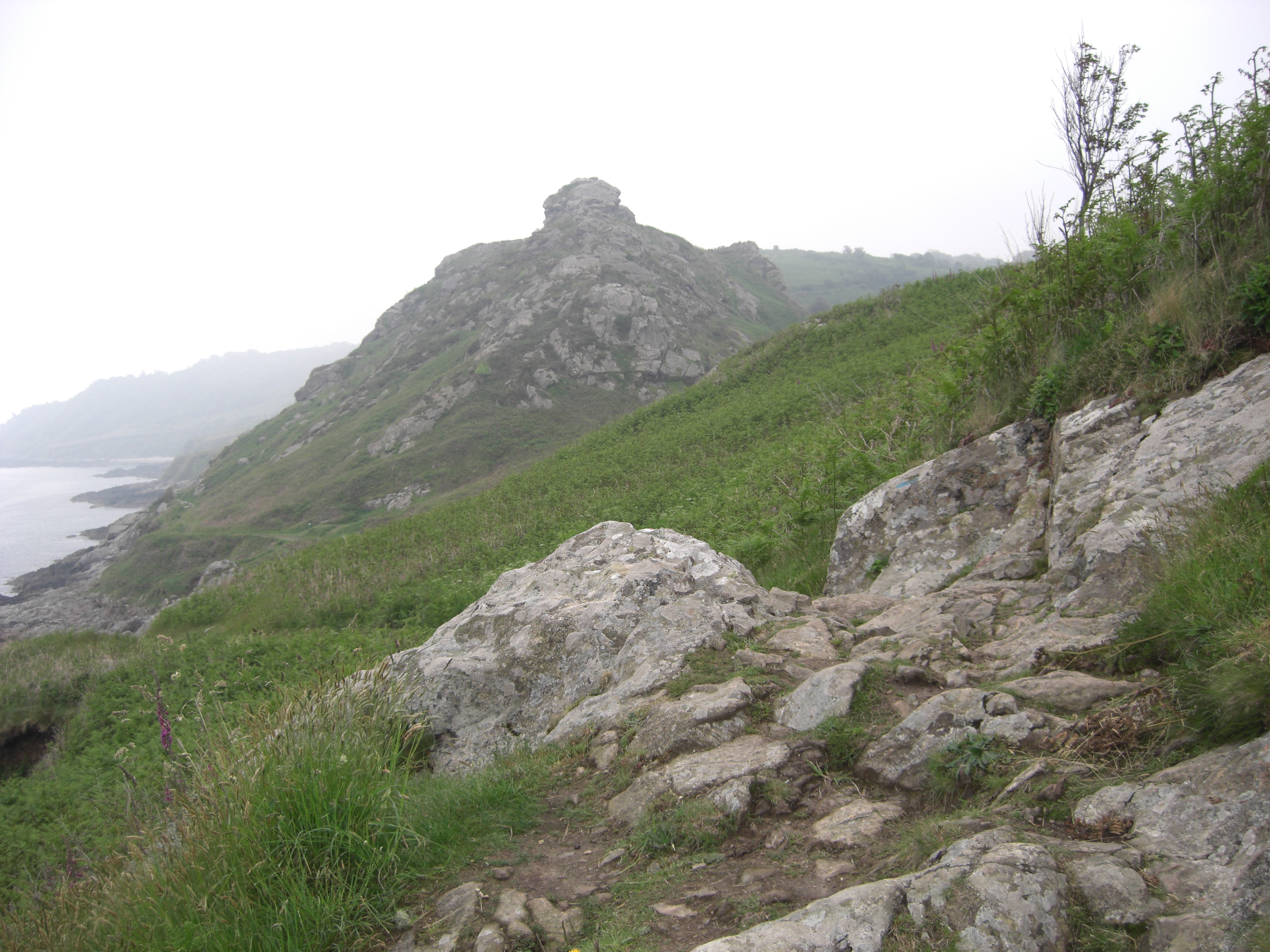
- The rock of Castel Vendon
- Location of Gréville-Hague
- Location within France Location within Normandy
- Coordinates: 49°40′30″N 1°48′00″W
- Country: France
- Region: Normandy
- Department: Manche
- Arrondissement: Cherbourg
- Canton: La Hague
- Commune: La Hague
- Area^{1}: 10.03 km^{2} (3.87 sq mi)
- Highest elevation: 167 m (548 ft)
- Lowest elevation: 0 m (0 ft)
- Population (2022): 649
  - Density: 64.7/km^{2} (168/sq mi)
- Demonym: Grévillais
- Time zone: UTC+01:00 (CET)
  - Summer (DST): UTC+02:00 (CEST)
- Postal code: 50440
- Website: www.greville-hague.fr
- ^{1} French Land Register data, which excludes lakes, ponds, glaciers > 1 km^{2} (0.386 sq mi or 247 acres) and river estuaries.

Gréville-Hague (French pronunciation: [ɡʁevil aɡ]) is a former commune in the Manche department in Normandy in north-western France. On 1 January 2017, it was merged into the new commune La Hague. A hamlet (Gruchy) of the village is the birthplace of Jean-François Millet, a notable Realist painter. Several of his most important paintings depict local landscapes or rural labour.

Location of a major World War II battery, as well as massive French fortifications (never completed) to protect the deep-water port of Cherbourg.

== See also ==
- Communes of the Manche department
