= Rosenblattichthys =

Scientific classification
- Domain: Eukaryota
- Kingdom: Animalia
- Phylum: Chordata
- Class: Actinopterygii
- Order: Aulopiformes
- Family: Scopelarchidae
- Genus: Rosenblattichthys; R. K. Johnson, 1974

Species
- See text

Genus of ray-finned fishes

Rosenblattichthys is a genus of pearleyes.

== Species ==
There are currently four recognized species in this genus:

- Rosenblattichthys alatus (Fourmanoir, 1970) (Winged pearleye)
- Rosenblattichthys hubbsi R. K. Johnson, 1974 (Hubb's pearleye)
- Rosenblattichthys nemotoi Okiyama & R. K. Johnson, 1986
- Rosenblattichthys volucris (Rofen, 1966) (Chubby pearleye)
