= Beaumont-Hague =

- Part of La Hague
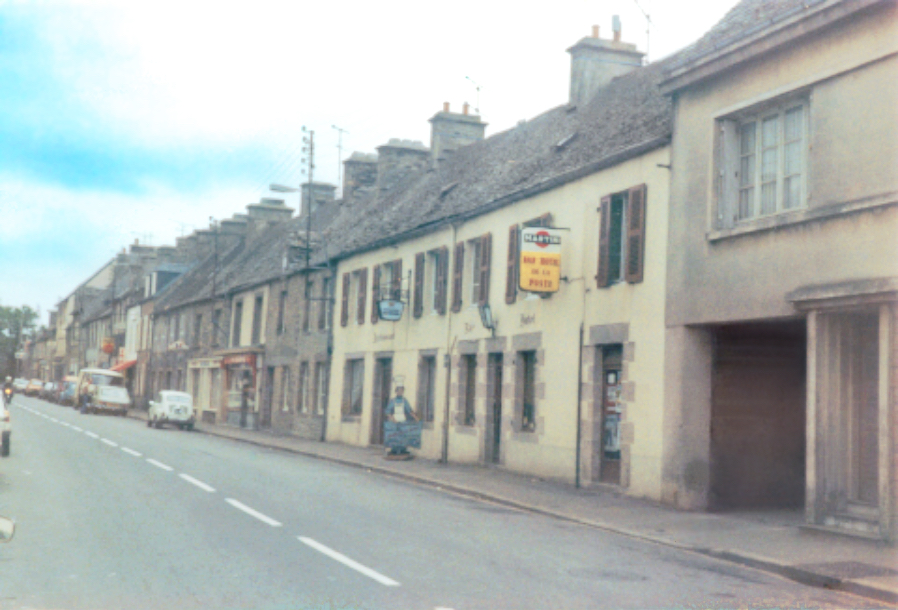
- Rue Jallot

- Coat of arms
- Location of Beaumont-Hague
- Location within France Location within Normandy
- Coordinates: 49°39′52″N 1°50′08″W
- Country: France
- Region: Normandy
- Department: Manche
- Arrondissement: Cherbourg
- Canton: La Hague
- Commune: La Hague
- Area^{1}: 7.90 km^{2} (3.05 sq mi)
- Elevation: 166 m (545 ft)
- Highest elevation: 179 m (587 ft)
- Lowest elevation: 5 m (16 ft)
- Population (2022): 1,467
  - Density: 186/km^{2} (481/sq mi)
- Time zone: UTC+01:00 (CET)
  - Summer (DST): UTC+02:00 (CEST)
- Postal code: 50440
- ^{1} French Land Register data, which excludes lakes, ponds, glaciers > 1 km^{2} (0.386 sq mi or 247 acres) and river estuaries.

Beaumont-Hague (French pronunciation: [bomɔ̃ aɡ], before 1991: Beaumont) is a former commune in the Manche department in the Normandy region in northwestern France. On 1 January 2017, it was merged into the new commune La Hague.

== Population ==
Historical population

| Year | Pop. | ±% p.a. |
|---|---|---|
| 1793 | 508 | — |
| 1821 | 838 | +1.80% |
| 1846 | 839 | +0.00% |
| 1872 | 679 | −0.81% |
| 1901 | 606 | −0.39% |
| 1926 | 495 | −0.81% |
| 1946 | 559 | +0.61% |
| 1962 | 474 | −1.03% |

| Year | Pop. | ±% p.a. |
|---|---|---|
| 1968 | 1,010 | +13.44% |
| 1975 | 1,005 | −0.07% |
| 1982 | 1,361 | +4.43% |
| 1990 | 1,714 | +2.92% |
| 1999 | 1,381 | −2.37% |
| 2006 | 1,295 | −0.91% |
| 2022 | 1,467 | +0.78% |

Source: EHESS and INSEE

== Heraldry ==
| Arms of Beaumont-Hague | The arms of Beaumont-Hague are blazoned :Azure, on a chevron argent between 3 trefoils Or, 3 martlets azure the 2 in the base respectant. These arms are taken from those of the Jallot family (surviving), lords of Beaumont. |

== See also ==
- Communes of the Manche department
