= Scopelarchoides =

Scopelarchoides Temporal range: Early Oligocene–present

Scientific classification
- Kingdom: Animalia
- Phylum: Chordata
- Class: Actinopterygii
- Order: Aulopiformes
- Family: Scopelarchidae
- Genus: Scopelarchoides; Parr, 1929

Species
- See text

Genus of ray-finned fishes

Scopelarchoides is a genus of pearleyes.

== Species ==
There are currently five recognized species in this genus:

- Scopelarchoides climax R. K. Johnson, 1974
- Scopelarchoides danae R. K. Johnson, 1974 (Dana pearleye)
- Scopelarchoides kreffti R. K. Johnson, 1972 (Twin-striped pearleye)
- Scopelarchoides nicholsi A. E. Parr, 1929
- Scopelarchoides signifer R. K. Johnson, 1974

The only known fossil species is Scoleparchoides neamticus Grădianu, Přikryl, Baciu & Carnevale, 2019 from the Early Oligocene of Romania, which also represents the oldest skeletal fossil of the family.
