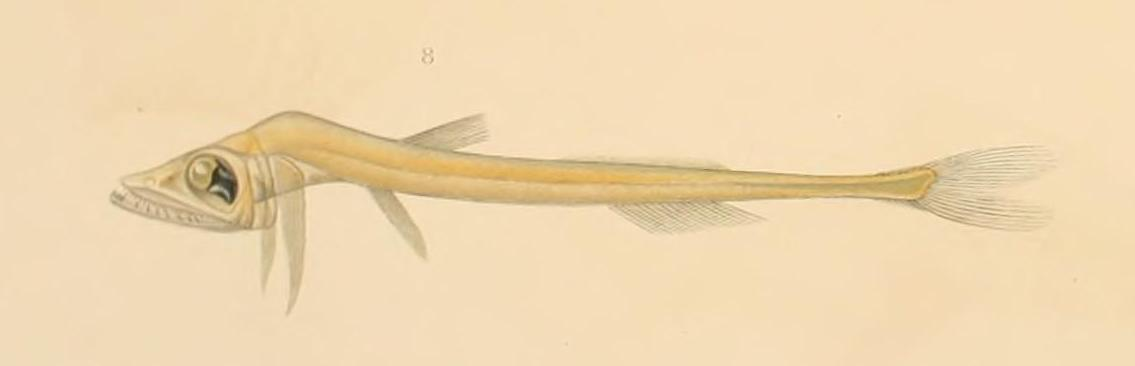
- Benthalbella infans

Scientific classification
- Kingdom: Animalia
- Phylum: Chordata
- Class: Actinopterygii
- Order: Aulopiformes
- Family: Scopelarchidae
- Genus: Benthalbella; Zugmayer, 1911

Species
- See text

= Benthalbella =

Benthalbella Temporal range: Middle Miocene to present

Genus of ray-finned fishes

Benthalbella is a genus of pearleyes.

== Species ==
There are currently 4 recognized species in this genus:

- Benthalbella dentata (W. M. Chapman, 1939) (northern pearleye)
- Benthalbella elongata (Norman, 1937)
- Benthalbella infans Zugmayer, 1911 (Zugmayer's pearleye)
- Benthalbella linguidens (Mead & J. E. Böhlke, 1953) (longfin pearleye)

The only known fossil species is †Benthalbella praecessor Nazarkin & Carnevale, 2018 from the Middle Miocene of Sakhalin Island, Russia.
