= Tonneville =

- Part of La Hague
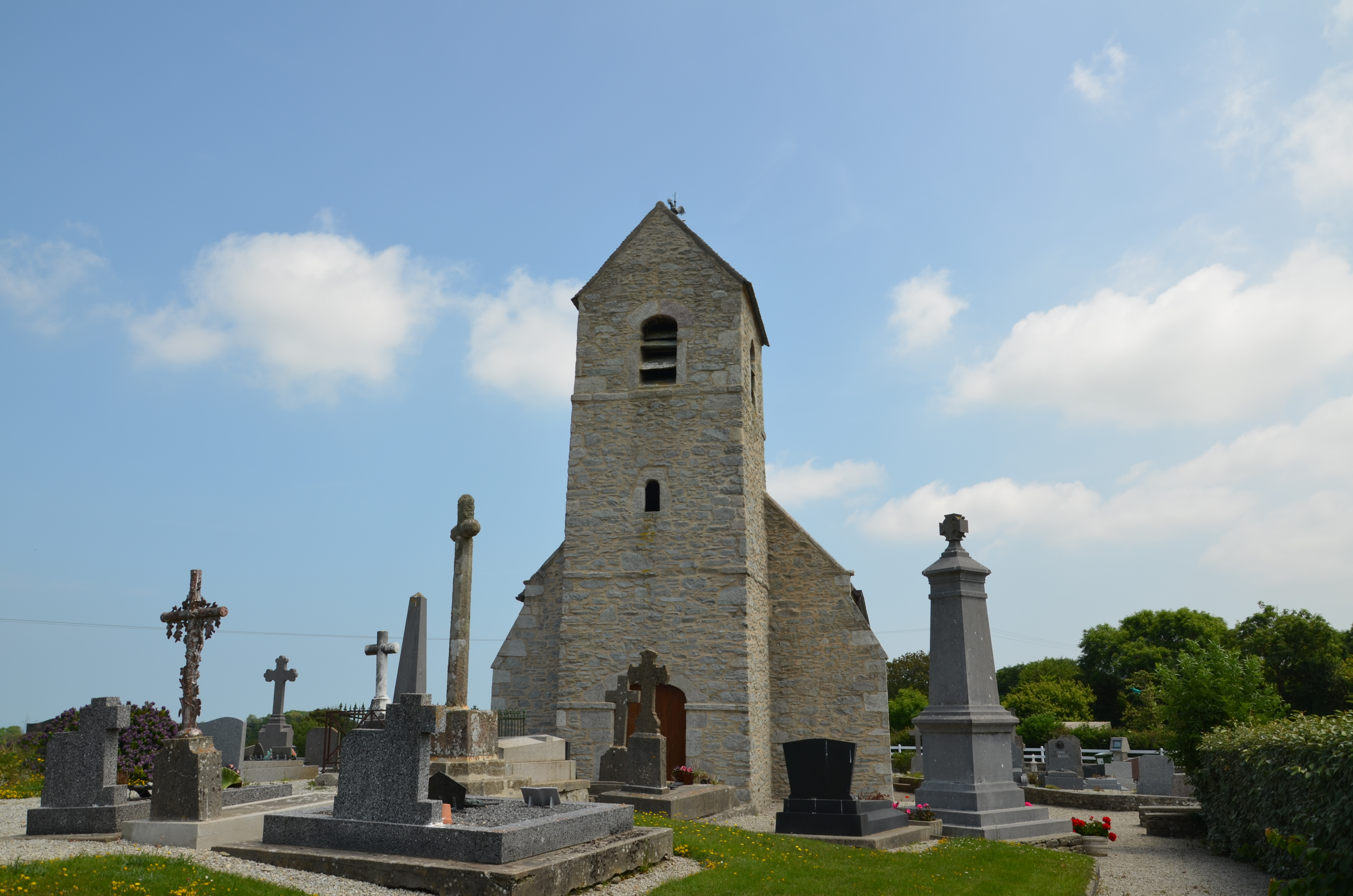
- The church of Saint-Martin

- Coat of arms
- Location of Tonneville
- Location within France Location within Normandy
- Coordinates: 49°38′40″N 1°42′54″W
- Country: France
- Region: Normandy
- Department: Manche
- Arrondissement: Cherbourg
- Canton: La Hague
- Commune: La Hague
- Area^{1}: 3.84 km^{2} (1.48 sq mi)
- Elevation: 100 m (330 ft)
- Highest elevation: 171 m (561 ft)
- Lowest elevation: 19 m (62 ft)
- Population (2022): 613
  - Density: 160/km^{2} (413/sq mi)
- Demonym: Tonnevillais
- Time zone: UTC+01:00 (CET)
  - Summer (DST): UTC+02:00 (CEST)
- Postal code: 50460
- ^{1} French Land Register data, which excludes lakes, ponds, glaciers > 1 km^{2} (0.386 sq mi or 247 acres) and river estuaries.

Tonneville (French pronunciation: [tɔnvil]) is a former commune in the Manche department in Normandy in north-western France. On 1 January 2017, it was merged into the new commune La Hague.

== See also ==
- Communes of the Manche department
