= Flottemanville-Hague =

- Part of La Hague
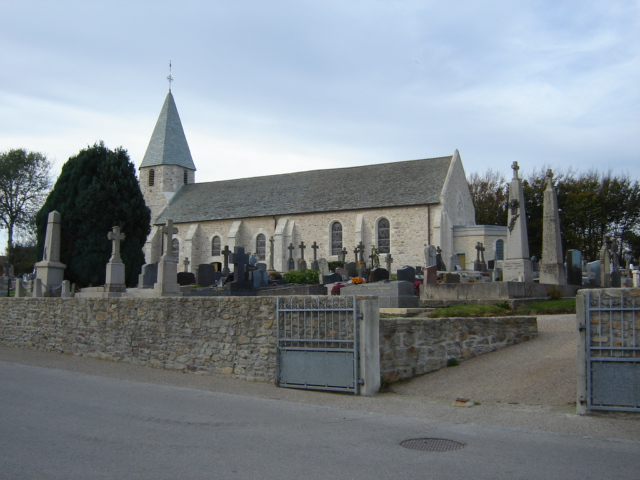
- The church of Flottemanville-Hague
- Location of Flottemanville-Hague
- Location within France Location within Normandy
- Coordinates: 49°37′21″N 1°43′16″W
- Country: France
- Region: Normandy
- Department: Manche
- Arrondissement: Cherbourg
- Canton: La Hague
- Commune: La Hague
- Area^{1}: 11.39 km^{2} (4.40 sq mi)
- Highest elevation: 179 m (587 ft)
- Lowest elevation: 45 m (148 ft)
- Population (2022): 979
  - Density: 86.0/km^{2} (223/sq mi)
- Demonym: Flottemanvillais
- Time zone: UTC+01:00 (CET)
  - Summer (DST): UTC+02:00 (CEST)
- Postal code: 50690
- ^{1} French Land Register data, which excludes lakes, ponds, glaciers > 1 km^{2} (0.386 sq mi or 247 acres) and river estuaries.

Flottemanville-Hague (French pronunciation: [flɔtmɑ̃vil aɡ]) is a former commune in the Manche department in north-western France. On 1 January 2017, it was merged into the new commune La Hague.

== See also ==
- Communes of the Manche department
