= Saint-Germain-des-Vaux =

- Part of La Hague
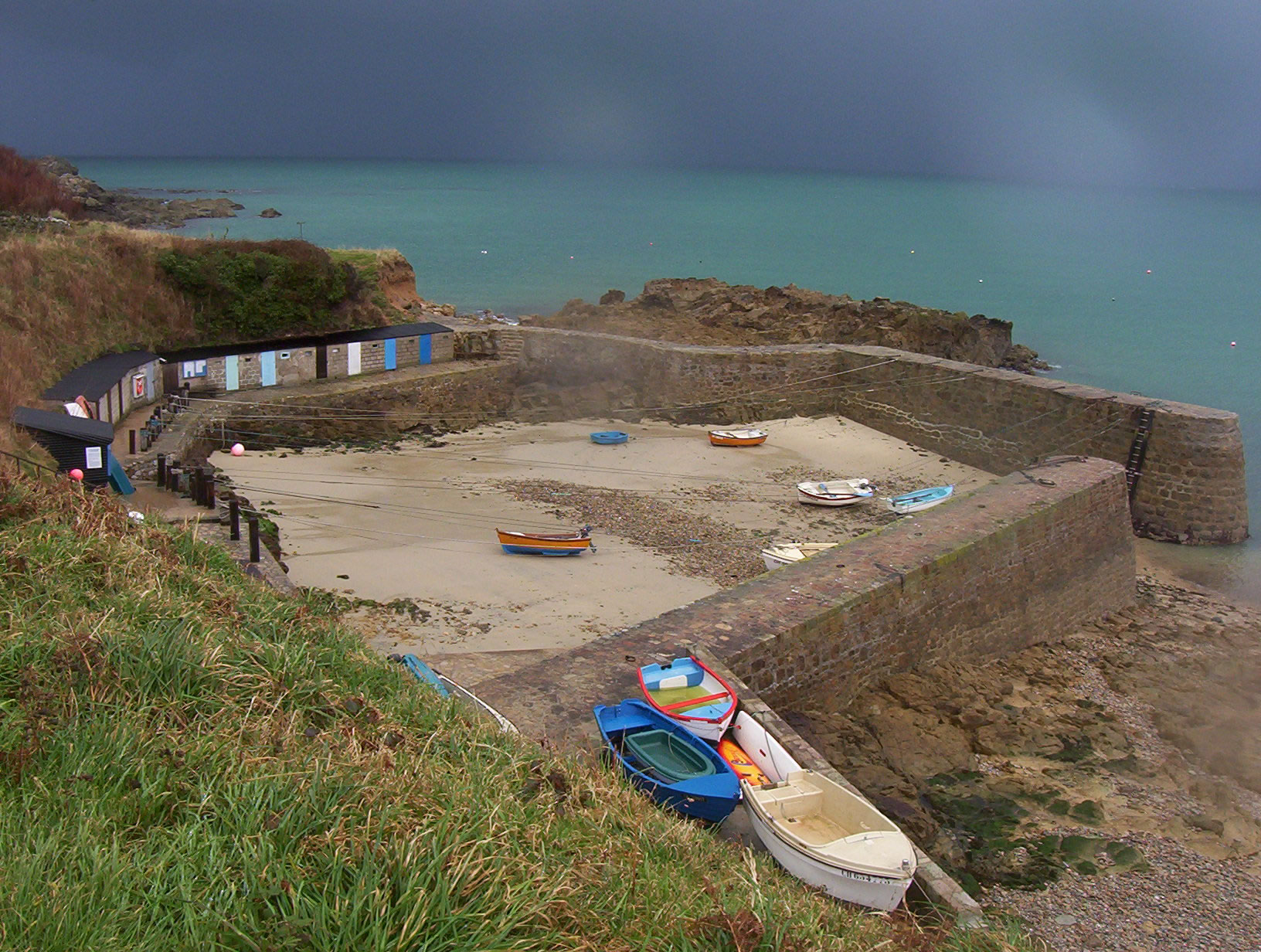
- Port Racine
- Location of Saint-Germain-des-Vaux
- Location within France Location within Normandy
- Coordinates: 49°42′46″N 1°55′08″W
- Country: France
- Region: Normandy
- Department: Manche
- Arrondissement: Cherbourg
- Canton: La Hague
- Commune: La Hague
- Area^{1}: 6.36 km^{2} (2.46 sq mi)
- Elevation: 30 m (98 ft)
- Highest elevation: 123 m (404 ft)
- Lowest elevation: 0 m (0 ft)
- Population (2022): 332
  - Density: 52.2/km^{2} (135/sq mi)
- Time zone: UTC+01:00 (CET)
  - Summer (DST): UTC+02:00 (CEST)
- Postal code: 50440
- ^{1} French Land Register data, which excludes lakes, ponds, glaciers > 1 km^{2} (0.386 sq mi or 247 acres) and river estuaries.

Saint-Germain-des-Vaux (French pronunciation: [sɛ̃ ʒɛʁmɛ̃ de vo]) is a former commune in the Manche department in Normandy in north-western France. On 1 January 2017, it was merged into the new commune La Hague.

== See also ==
- Communes of the Manche department
