= Lagiacrusichthys =

Conservation status
- Least Concern (IUCN 3.1)

Scientific classification
- Kingdom: Animalia
- Phylum: Chordata
- Class: Actinopterygii
- Order: Aulopiformes
- Family: Scopelarchidae
- Genus: Lagiacrusichthys; Davis, 2015
- Species: L. macropinna

Binomial name
- Lagiacrusichthys macropinna (Bussing & López Sanchez, 1966)

Synonyms
- Benthalbella macropinna Bussing & Bussing, 1966

Species of ray-finned fish

Lagiacrusichthys macropinna, the longfin greeneye, is a species of pearleye and the only species in the genus Lagiacrusichthys. L. macropinna live between 0–840 m depth, usually 500 m. This species occurs in Antarctic waters. This species is the only known member of its genus. The genus is named after the fictional monster Lagiacrus from the Monster Hunter video game series and franchise, as both are "rather ferocious coldwater predators" that inhabit the deep ocean.
