= Acqueville, Manche =

Acqueville
- Part of La Hague
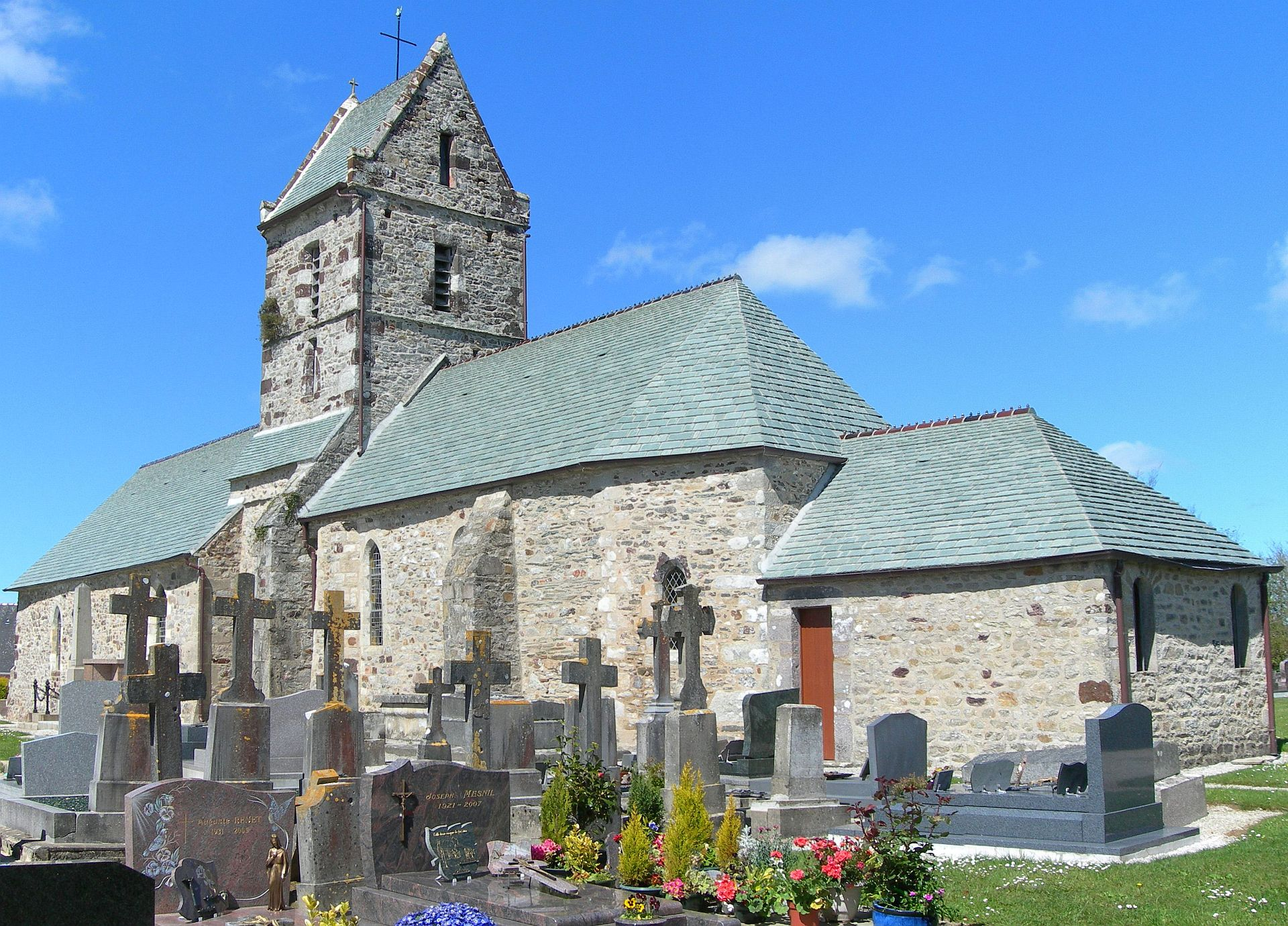
- Church of Notre-Dame
- Location of Acqueville
- Location within France Location within Normandy
- Coordinates: 49°36′37″N 1°44′53″W
- Country: France
- Region: Normandy
- Department: Manche
- Arrondissement: Cherbourg
- Canton: La Hague
- Commune: La Hague
- Area^{1}: 5.79 km^{2} (2.24 sq mi)
- Elevation: 150 m (490 ft)
- Highest elevation: 178 m (584 ft)
- Lowest elevation: 72 m (236 ft)
- Population (2021): 636
  - Density: 110/km^{2} (284/sq mi)
- Time zone: UTC+01:00 (CET)
  - Summer (DST): UTC+02:00 (CEST)
- Postal code: 50440
- ^{1} French Land Register data, which excludes lakes, ponds, glaciers > 1 km^{2} (0.386 sq mi or 247 acres) and river estuaries.

Acqueville (French pronunciation: [akvil]) is a former commune in the Manche department in the Normandy region in northwestern France. On 1 January 2017, it was merged into the new commune La Hague.

== Population ==
Historical population
Year	Pop.	±% p.a.
2006	634	—
2011	657	+0.72%
2021	636	−0.32%
Source: INSEE

== See also ==
- Communes of the Manche department
