= Branville-Hague =

- Part of La Hague
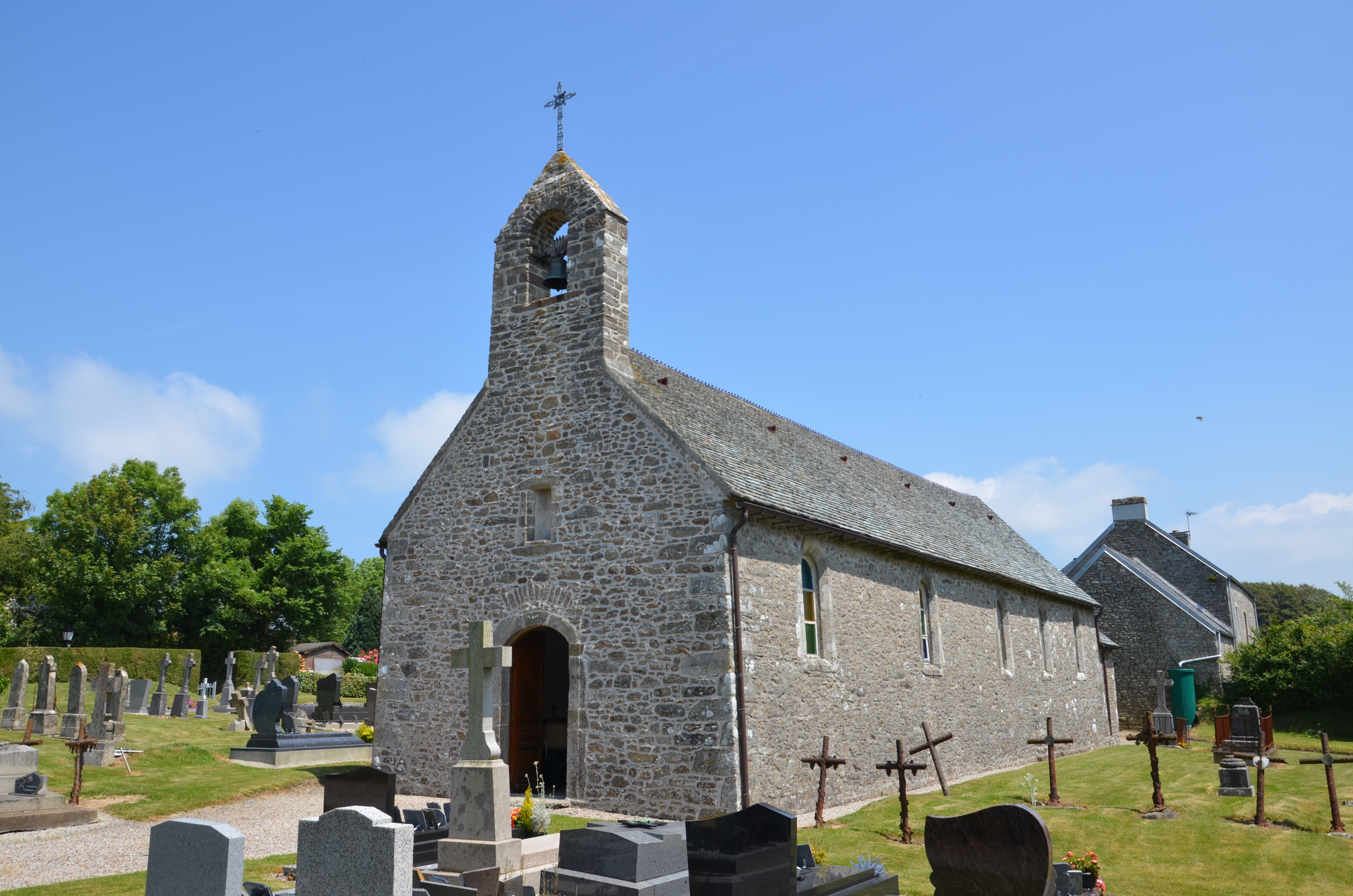
- The church of Notre-Dame
- Location of Branville-Hague
- Location within France Location within Normandy
- Coordinates: 49°39′21″N 1°47′02″W
- Country: France
- Region: Normandy
- Department: Manche
- Arrondissement: Cherbourg
- Canton: La Hague
- Commune: La Hague
- Area^{1}: 2.12 km^{2} (0.82 sq mi)
- Elevation: 100 m (330 ft)
- Highest elevation: 164 m (538 ft)
- Lowest elevation: 98 m (322 ft)
- Population (2023): 155
  - Density: 73.1/km^{2} (189/sq mi)
- Time zone: UTC+01:00 (CET)
  - Summer (DST): UTC+02:00 (CEST)
- Postal code: 50440
- ^{1} French Land Register data, which excludes lakes, ponds, glaciers > 1 km^{2} (0.386 sq mi or 247 acres) and river estuaries.

Branville-Hague (French pronunciation: [bʁɑ̃vil aɡ], before 1962: Branville) is a former commune in the Manche department in Normandy in northwestern France. On 1 January 2017, it was merged into the new commune La Hague.

== See also ==
- Communes of the Manche department
