= La Hague =

Administrative division in Normandy, France

- Commune
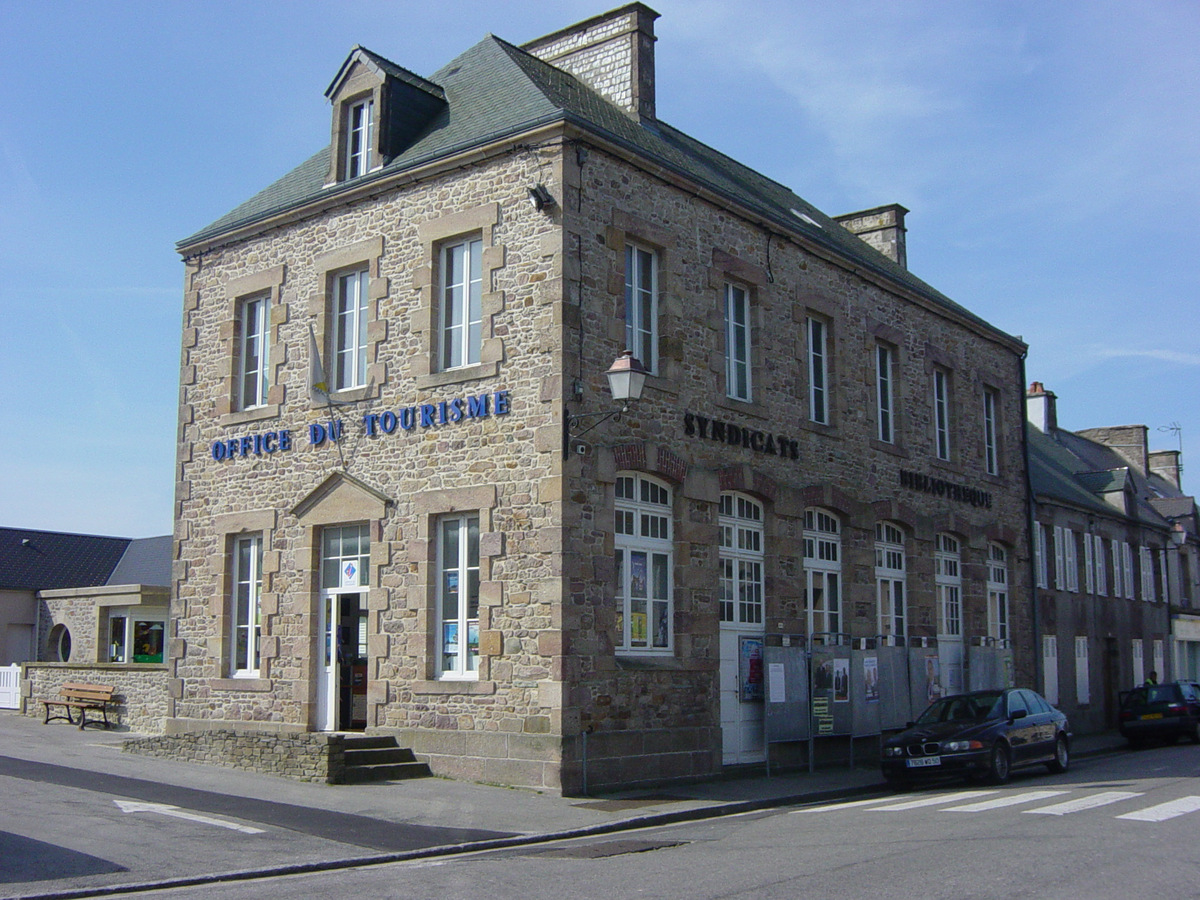
- The tourist office in Beaumont-Hague
- Location of La Hague
- Location within France Location within Normandy
- Coordinates: 49°39′50″N 1°50′10″W
- Country: France
- Region: Normandy
- Department: Manche
- Arrondissement: Cherbourg
- Canton: La Hague
- Intercommunality: CA Cotentin

Government
  - Mayor (2020–2026): Manuela Mahier
- Area^{1}: 148.68 km^{2} (57.41 sq mi)
- Population (2023): 11,484
  - Density: 77.240/km^{2} (200.05/sq mi)
- Time zone: UTC+01:00 (CET)
  - Summer (DST): UTC+02:00 (CEST)
- INSEE/Postal code: 50041 /50440, 50460, 50680
- ^{1} French Land Register data, which excludes lakes, ponds, glaciers > 1 km^{2} (0.386 sq mi or 247 acres) and river estuaries.

La Hague (French pronunciation: [la aɡ]) is a commune in the department of Manche, northwestern France. The municipality was established on 1 January 2017 by merger of the former communes of Beaumont-Hague (the seat), Acqueville, Auderville, Biville, Branville-Hague, Digulleville, Éculleville, Flottemanville-Hague, Gréville-Hague, Herqueville, Jobourg, Omonville-la-Petite, Omonville-la-Rogue, Sainte-Croix-Hague, Saint-Germain-des-Vaux, Tonneville, Urville-Nacqueville, Vasteville and Vauville.

== Population ==
Historical population
Year	Pop.	±% p.a.
1968	6,044	—
1975	5,933	−0.26%
1982	7,487	+3.38%
1990	10,689	+4.55%
1999	10,879	+0.20%
2007	11,524	+0.72%
2012	11,932	+0.70%
2017	11,634	−0.50%
2023	11,484	−0.22%
Populations of the area corresponding with the commune of La Hague at 1 January 2025. Source: INSEE

== Sights ==
- The Brasserie waterfall, fed by the Sainte-Hélène stream, supplies water to the hamlet of La Brasserie, located south of the town.
- Quervière Bay with the Pointe du Cormoran headland.
- The Vauville pond nature reserve.
- The Castel Vendon rock, painted by Jean-François Millet, in Gréville-Hague.

== See also ==
- Communes of the Manche department
