= Omonville-la-Petite =

- Part of La Hague
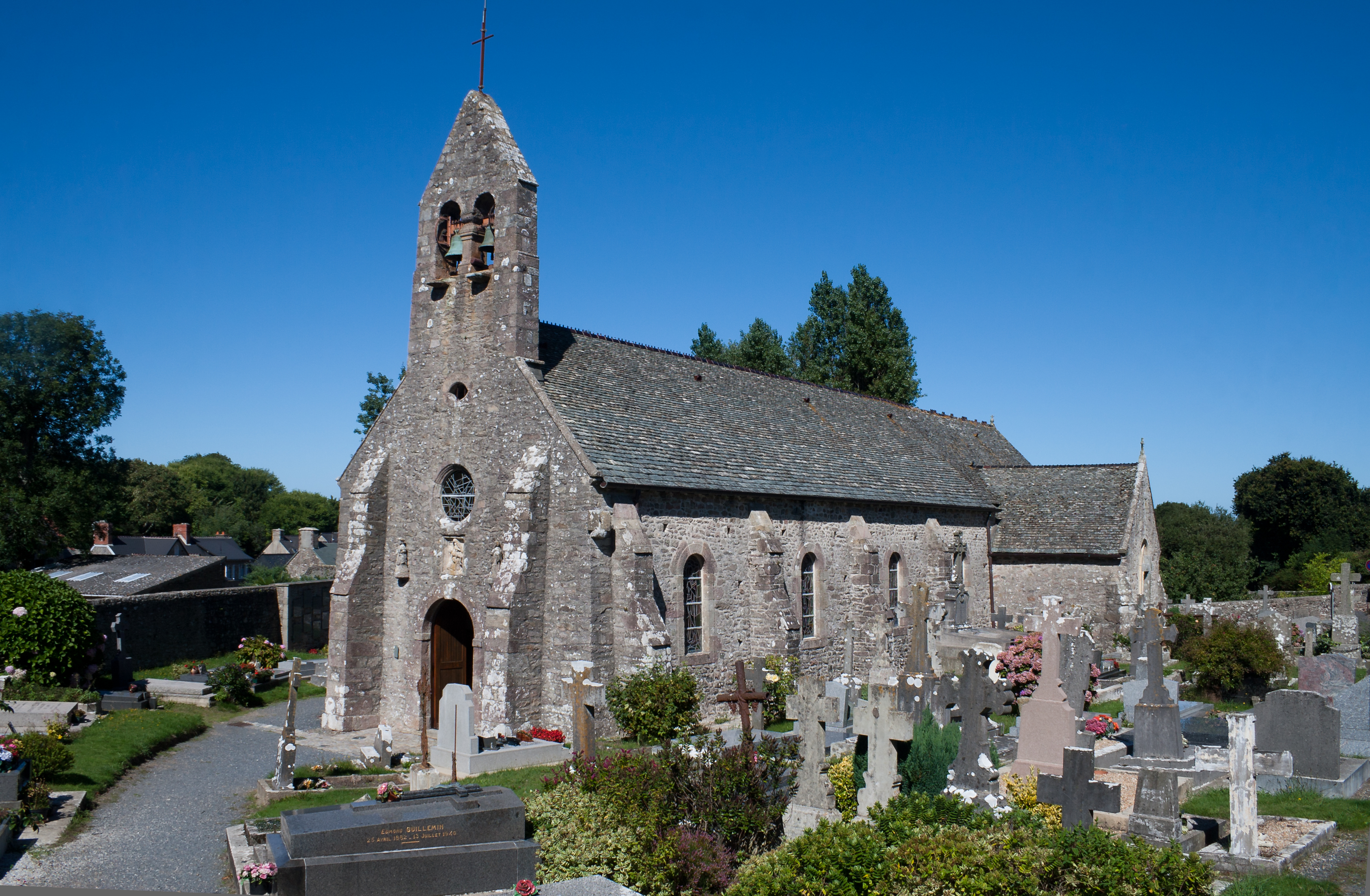
- The church of Saint-Martin
- Location of Omonville-la-Petite
- Location within France Location within Normandy
- Coordinates: 49°42′00″N 1°52′59″W
- Country: France
- Region: Normandy
- Department: Manche
- Arrondissement: Cherbourg
- Canton: La Hague
- Commune: La Hague
- Area^{1}: 6.16 km^{2} (2.38 sq mi)
- Elevation: 50 m (160 ft)
- Highest elevation: 181 m (594 ft)
- Lowest elevation: 0 m (0 ft)
- Population (2022): 119
  - Density: 19.3/km^{2} (50.0/sq mi)
- Time zone: UTC+01:00 (CET)
  - Summer (DST): UTC+02:00 (CEST)
- Postal code: 50440
- ^{1} French Land Register data, which excludes lakes, ponds, glaciers > 1 km^{2} (0.386 sq mi or 247 acres) and river estuaries.

Omonville-la-Petite (French pronunciation: [ɔmɔ̃vil la pətit]) is a former commune in the Manche department in Normandy in north-western France. On 1 January 2017, it was merged into the new commune La Hague.

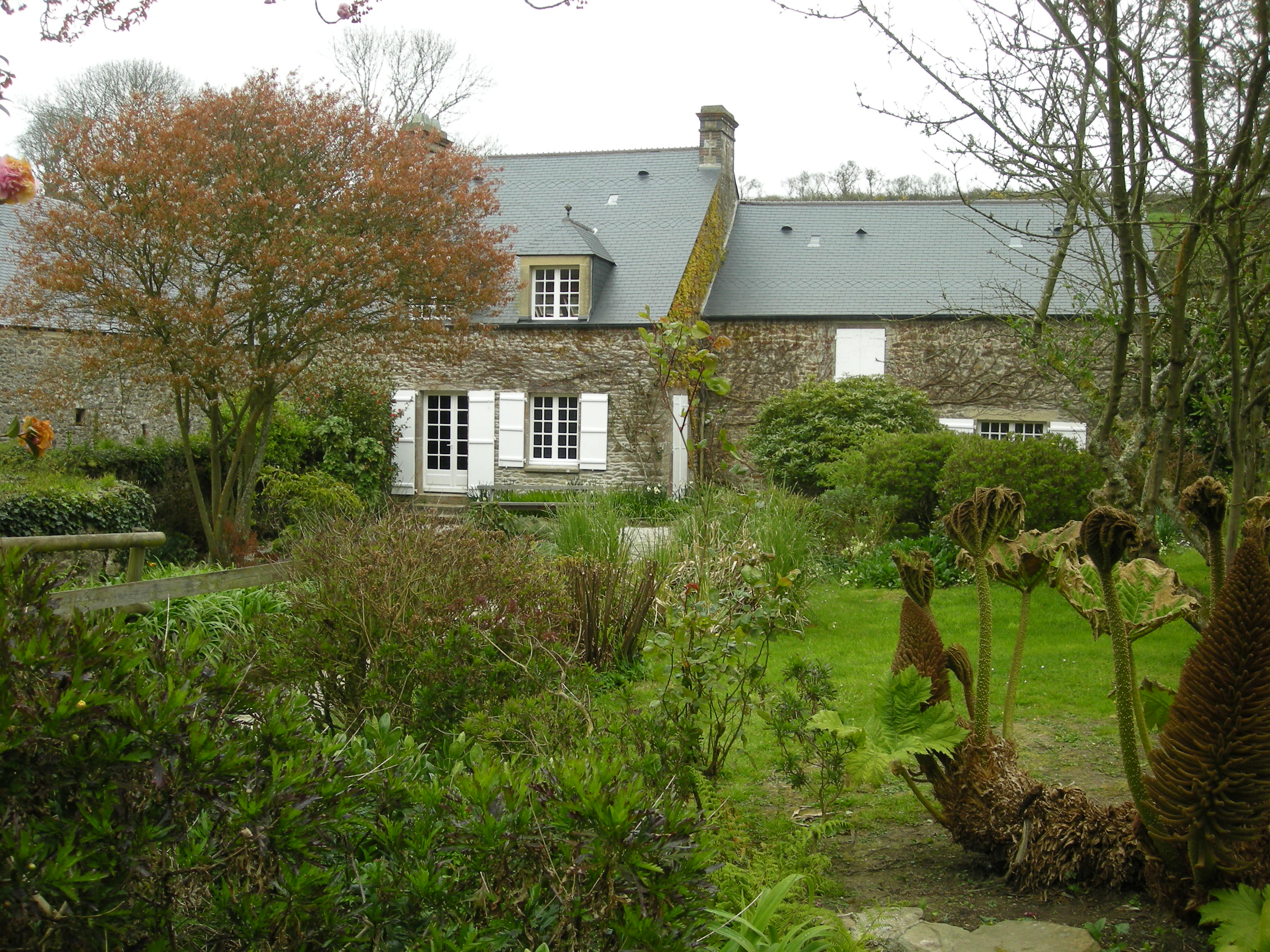
The house of Jacques Prévert in Ormonville

Ormonville is known to be the place where French poet Jacques Prévert (1900–1977) lived the last years of his life and where he is buried.

It is also the birthplace of French biologist Félix Mesnil (1868–1938).

== See also ==
- Communes of the Manche department
