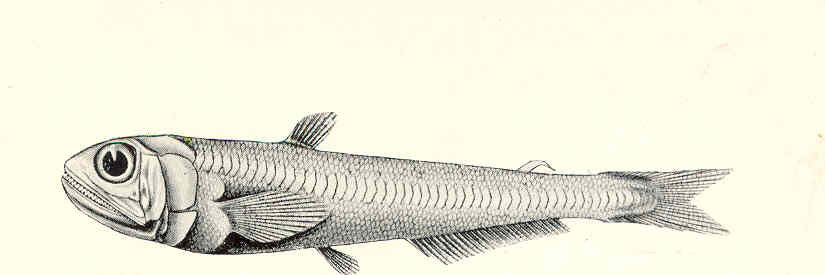
- Scopelarchus guentheri

Scientific classification
- Domain: Eukaryota
- Kingdom: Animalia
- Phylum: Chordata
- Class: Actinopterygii
- Order: Aulopiformes
- Family: Scopelarchidae
- Genus: Scopelarchus; Alcock, 1896

= Scopelarchus =

Genus of ray-finned fishes

Scopelarchus is a genus of pearleyes.

== Species ==
There are currently four recognized species in this genus:

- Scopelarchus analis (A. B. Brauer, 1902) (Short fin pearleye)
- Scopelarchus guentheri Alcock, 1896 (Staring pearleye)
- Scopelarchus michaelsarsi Koefoed, 1955 (Bigfin pearleye)
- Scopelarchus stephensi R. K. Johnson, 1974
