= Sainte-Croix-Hague =

- Part of La Hague
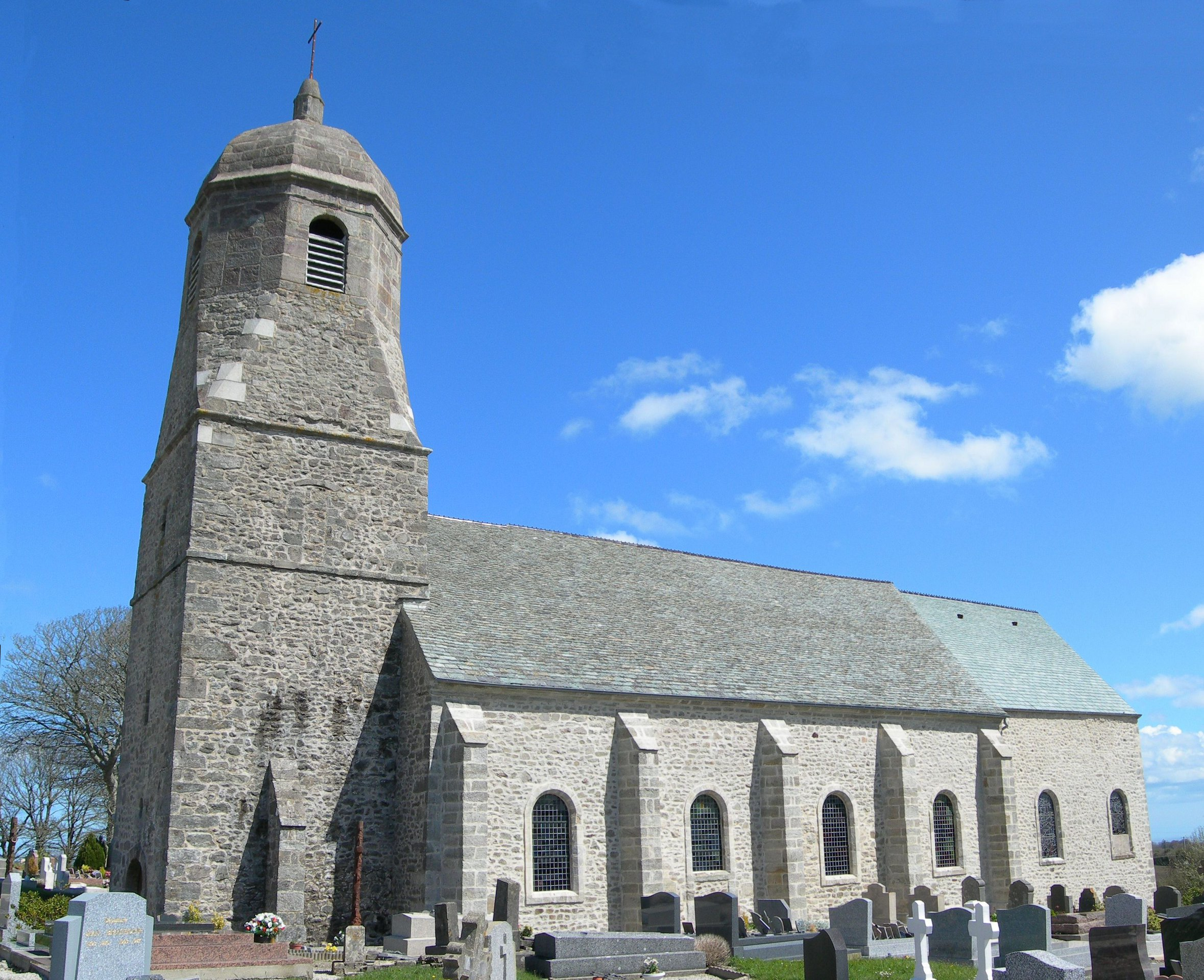
- The church of Sainte-Croix
- Location of Sainte-Croix-Hague
- Location within France Location within Normandy
- Coordinates: 49°38′21″N 1°46′16″W
- Country: France
- Region: Normandy
- Department: Manche
- Arrondissement: Cherbourg
- Canton: La Hague
- Commune: La Hague
- Area^{1}: 9.84 km^{2} (3.80 sq mi)
- Highest elevation: 182 m (597 ft)
- Lowest elevation: 60 m (200 ft)
- Population (2022): 828
  - Density: 84.1/km^{2} (218/sq mi)
- Time zone: UTC+01:00 (CET)
  - Summer (DST): UTC+02:00 (CEST)
- Postal code: 50440
- ^{1} French Land Register data, which excludes lakes, ponds, glaciers > 1 km^{2} (0.386 sq mi or 247 acres) and river estuaries.

Sainte-Croix-Hague (French pronunciation: [sɛ̃ kʁwa aɡ]) is a former commune in the Manche department in Normandy in north-western France. On 1 January 2017, it was merged into the new commune La Hague.

== See also ==
- Communes of the Manche department
