= Herqueville, Manche =

Herqueville
- Part of La Hague
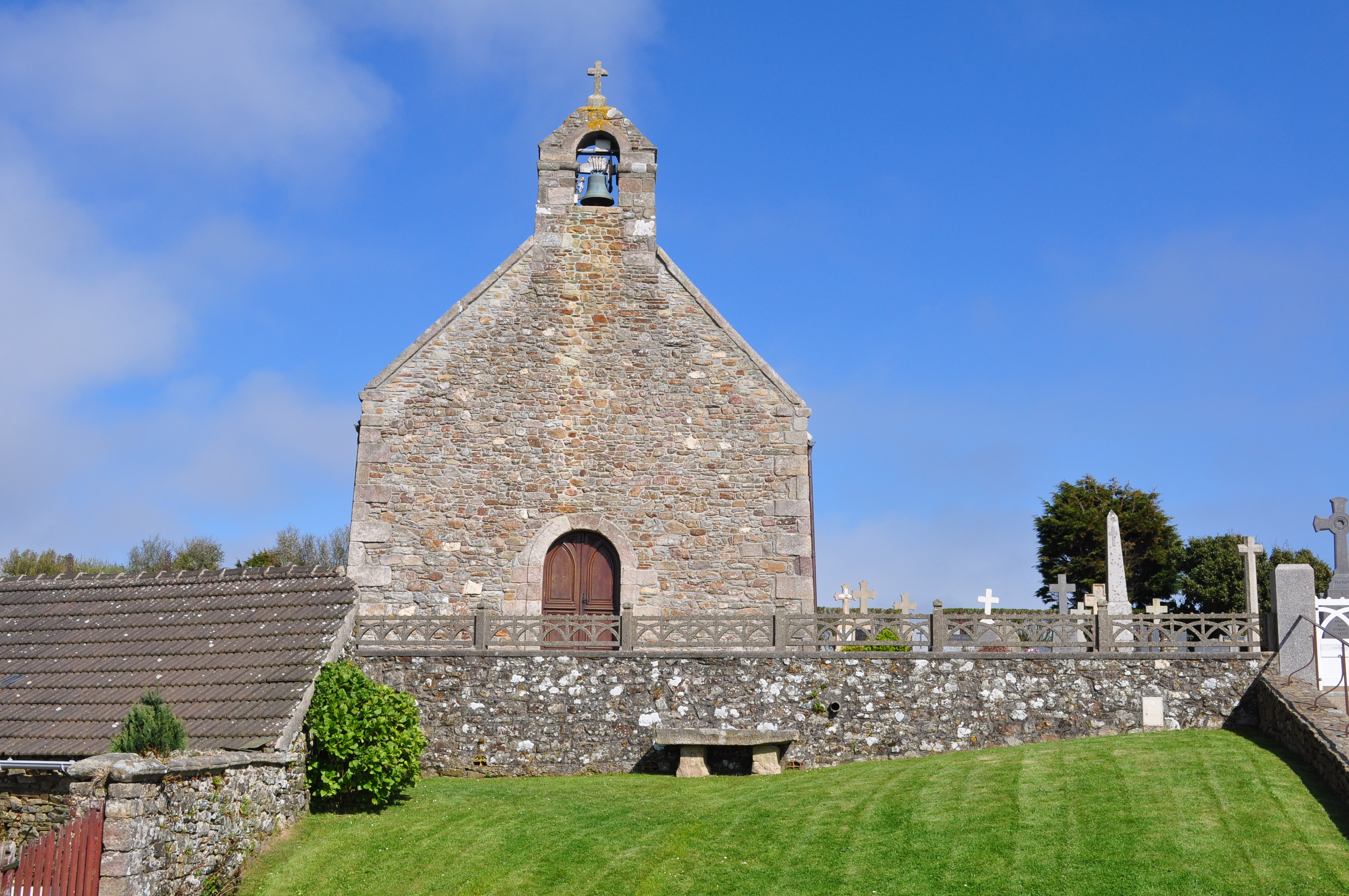
- The church of Saint-Michel
- Location of Herqueville
- Location within France Location within Normandy
- Coordinates: 49°40′06″N 1°52′34″W
- Country: France
- Region: Normandy
- Department: Manche
- Arrondissement: Cherbourg
- Canton: La Hague
- Commune: La Hague
- Area^{1}: 2.91 km^{2} (1.12 sq mi)
- Elevation: 164 m (538 ft)
- Highest elevation: 178 m (584 ft)
- Lowest elevation: 0 m (0 ft)
- Population (2022): 146
  - Density: 50.2/km^{2} (130/sq mi)
- Demonym: Herquevillais
- Time zone: UTC+01:00 (CET)
  - Summer (DST): UTC+02:00 (CEST)
- Postal code: 50440
- ^{1} French Land Register data, which excludes lakes, ponds, glaciers > 1 km^{2} (0.386 sq mi or 247 acres) and river estuaries.

Herqueville (French pronunciation: [ɛʁkəvil]) is a former commune in the Manche department in northwestern France. On 1 January 2017, it was merged into the new commune La Hague.

== See also ==
- Communes of the Manche department
