= Biville =

- Part of La Hague
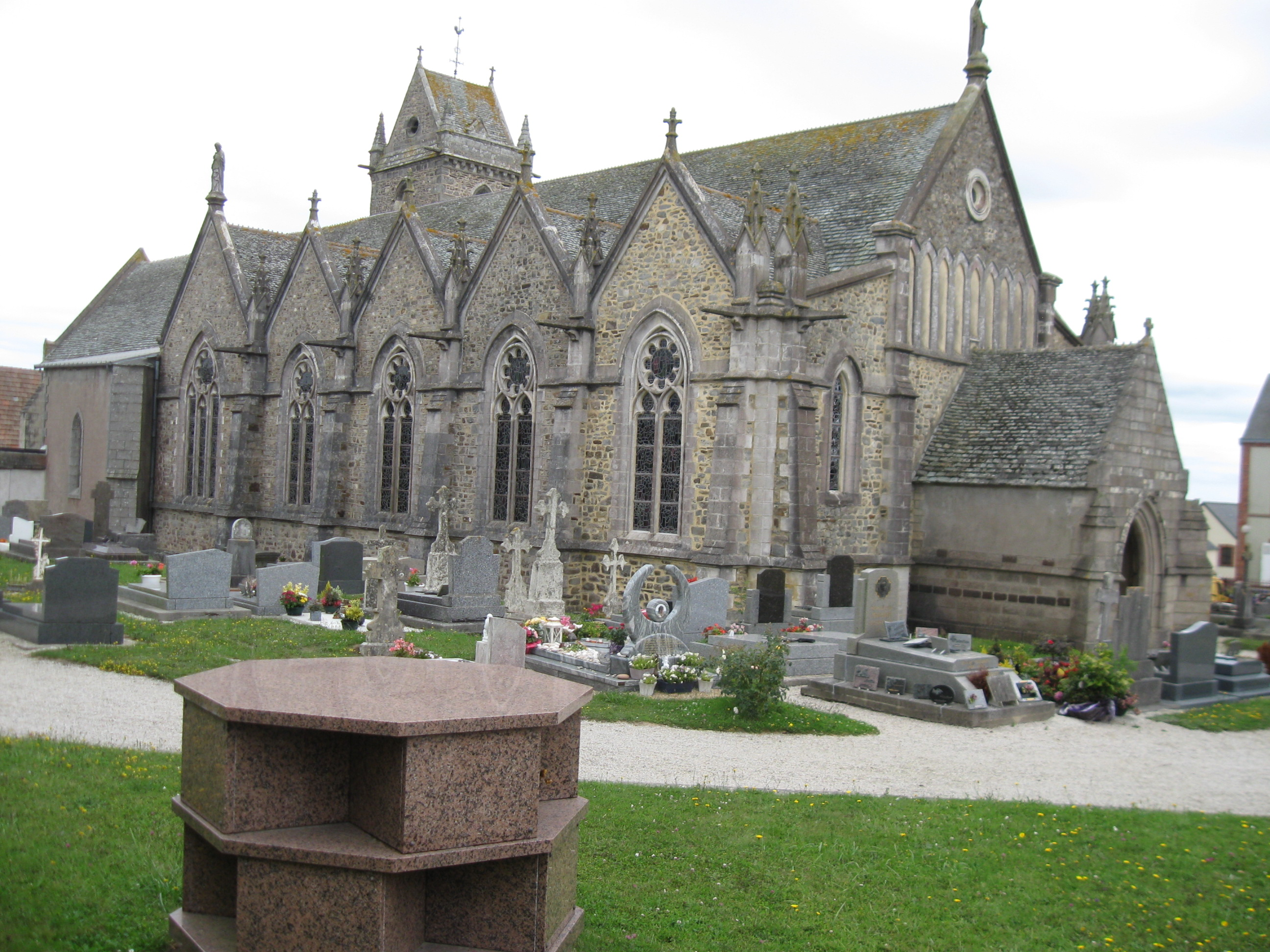
- The church of Saint-Pierre
- Location of Biville
- Location within France Location within Normandy
- Coordinates: 49°36′49″N 1°49′16″W
- Country: France
- Region: Normandy
- Department: Manche
- Arrondissement: Cherbourg
- Canton: La Hague
- Commune: La Hague
- Area^{1}: 8.70 km^{2} (3.36 sq mi)
- Elevation: 125 m (410 ft)
- Highest elevation: 179 m (587 ft)
- Lowest elevation: 2 m (6.6 ft)
- Population (2023): 524
  - Density: 60.2/km^{2} (156/sq mi)
- Time zone: UTC+01:00 (CET)
  - Summer (DST): UTC+02:00 (CEST)
- Postal code: 50440
- ^{1} French Land Register data, which excludes lakes, ponds, glaciers > 1 km^{2} (0.386 sq mi or 247 acres) and river estuaries.

Biville (French pronunciation: [bivil]) is a former commune in the Manche department in the Normandy region in northwestern France. On 1 January 2017, it was merged into the new commune La Hague.

The parish church, dedicated to Saint Peter, also houses the relics of a native son of Biville, the priest and miracle-worker Thomas Hélye (1187–1257).

== See also ==
- Communes of the Manche department
- Information and images about Biville Dunes, area of outstanding natural beauty and military memorial.
