= Vauville, Manche =

Vauville
- Part of La Hague
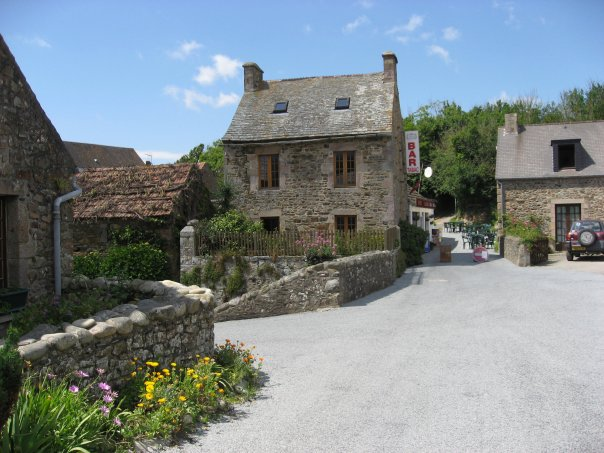

- Coat of arms
- Location of Vauville
- Location within France Location within Normandy
- Coordinates: 49°38′18″N 1°50′43″W
- Country: France
- Region: Normandy
- Department: Manche
- Arrondissement: Cherbourg
- Canton: La Hague
- Commune: La Hague
- Area^{1}: 16.35 km^{2} (6.31 sq mi)
- Elevation: 40 m (130 ft)
- Highest elevation: 182 m (597 ft)
- Lowest elevation: 3 m (9.8 ft)
- Population (2022): 300
  - Density: 18/km^{2} (48/sq mi)
- Demonym: Vauvillais
- Time zone: UTC+01:00 (CET)
  - Summer (DST): UTC+02:00 (CEST)
- Postal code: 50440
- ^{1} French Land Register data, which excludes lakes, ponds, glaciers > 1 km^{2} (0.386 sq mi or 247 acres) and river estuaries.

Vauville (French pronunciation: [vovil]) is a former commune in the Manche department in Normandy in north-western France. On 1 January 2017, it was merged into the new commune La Hague.

== See also ==
- Communes of the Manche department
