= Omonville-la-Rogue =

- Part of La Hague
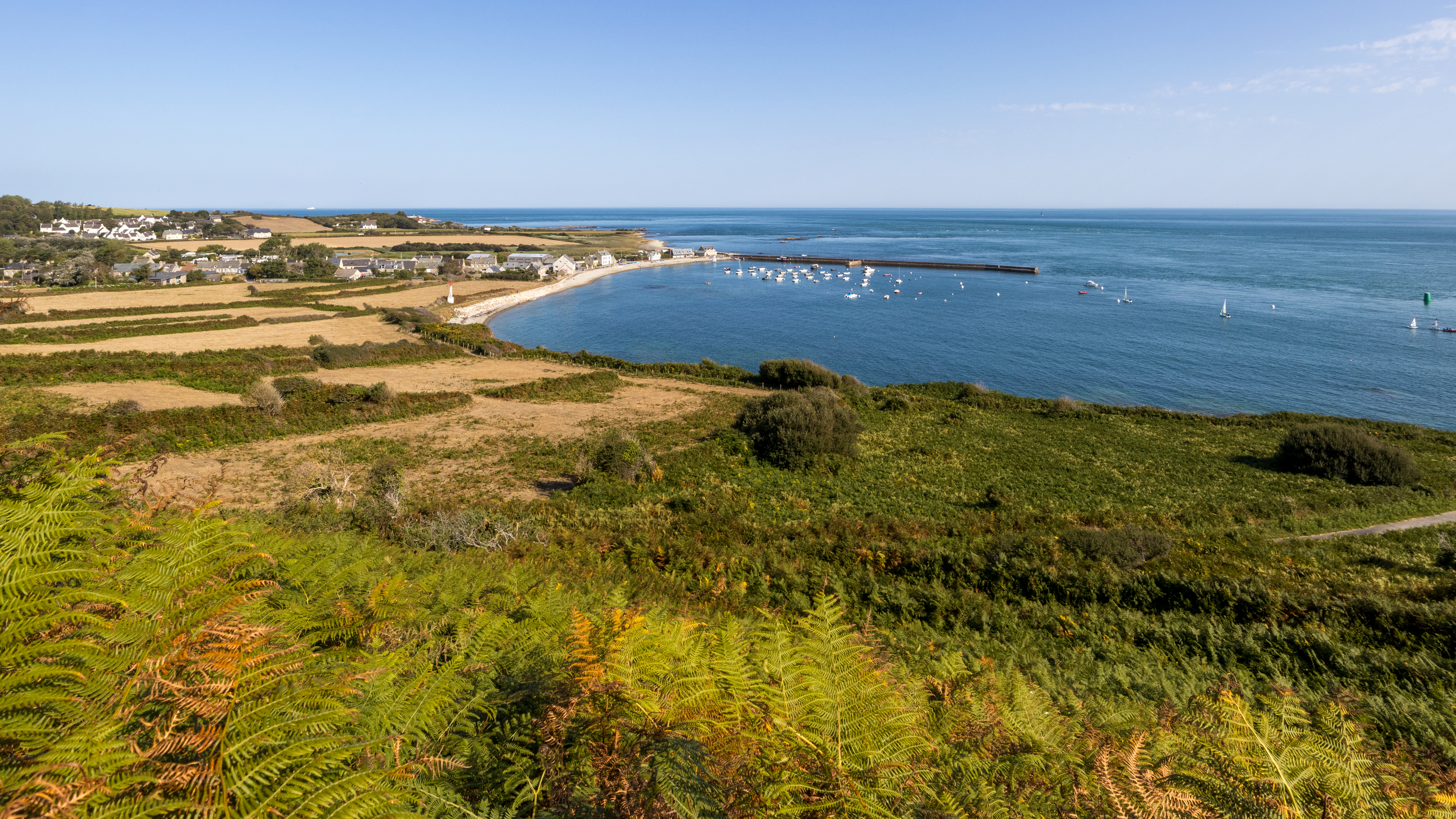
- Port du Hâble, seen from the fort
- Location of Omonville-la-Rogue
- Location within France Location within Normandy
- Coordinates: 49°42′12″N 1°50′32″W
- Country: France
- Region: Normandy
- Department: Manche
- Arrondissement: Cherbourg
- Canton: La Hague
- Commune: La Hague
- Area^{1}: 4.29 km^{2} (1.66 sq mi)
- Elevation: 20 m (66 ft)
- Highest elevation: 133 m (436 ft)
- Lowest elevation: 0 m (0 ft)
- Population (2022): 485
  - Density: 113/km^{2} (293/sq mi)
- Demonym: Omonvillais
- Time zone: UTC+01:00 (CET)
  - Summer (DST): UTC+02:00 (CEST)
- Postal code: 50440
- ^{1} French Land Register data, which excludes lakes, ponds, glaciers > 1 km^{2} (0.386 sq mi or 247 acres) and river estuaries.

Omonville-la-Rogue (French pronunciation: [ɔmɔ̃vil la ʁɔɡ]) is a former commune in the Manche department in Normandy in north-western France. On 1 January 2017, it was merged into the new commune La Hague. It is the site of one of the few ports on this rugged coastline.

== See also ==
- Communes of the Manche department
