= Éculleville =

- Part of La Hague
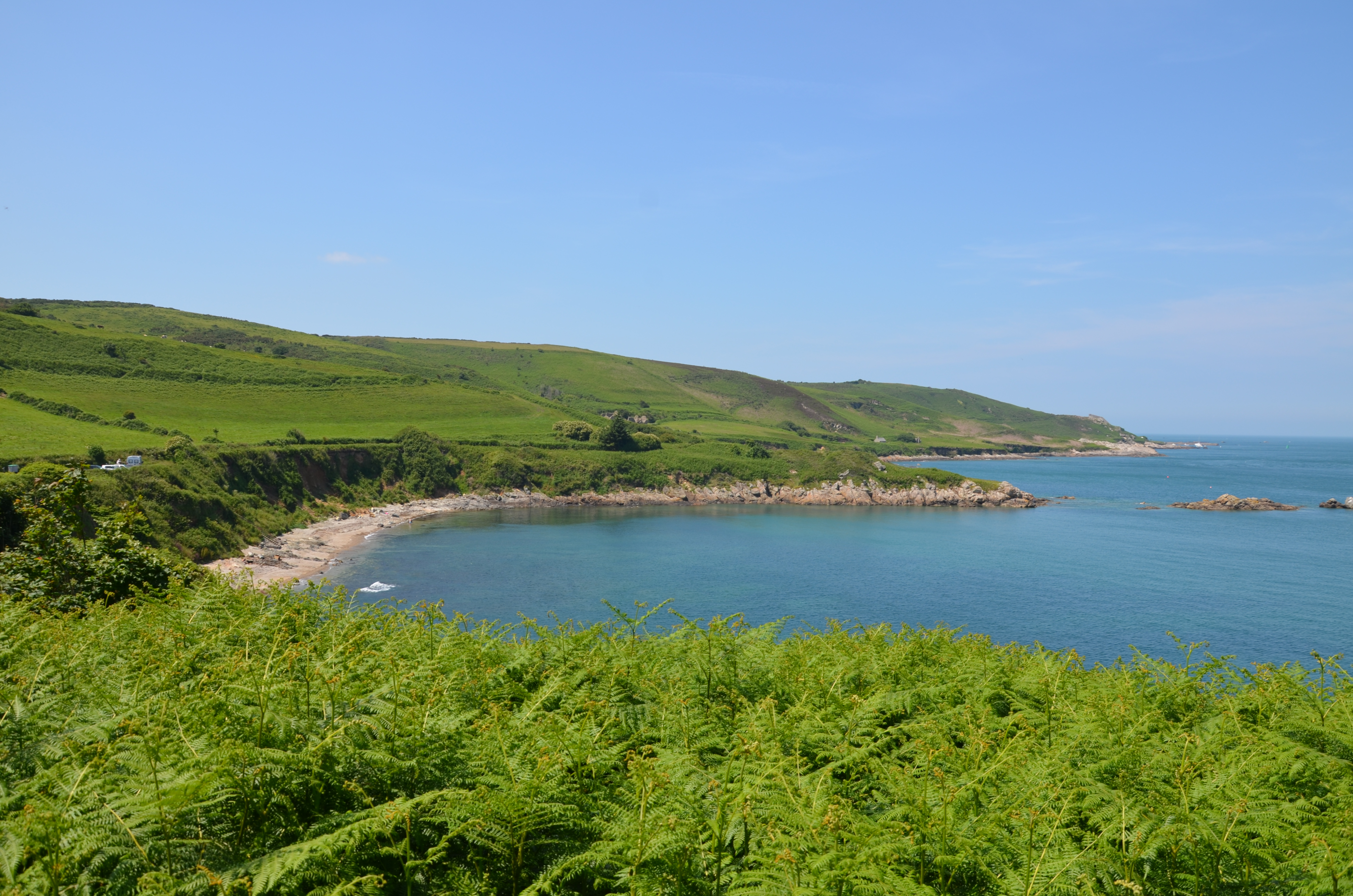
- The bay of Quervière
- Location of Éculleville
- Location within France Location within Normandy
- Coordinates: 49°40′59″N 1°49′13″W
- Country: France
- Region: Normandy
- Department: Manche
- Arrondissement: Cherbourg
- Canton: La Hague
- Commune: La Hague
- Area^{1}: 2.33 km^{2} (0.90 sq mi)
- Elevation: 145 m (476 ft)
- Highest elevation: 152 m (499 ft)
- Lowest elevation: 0 m (0 ft)
- Population (2022): 47
  - Density: 20/km^{2} (52/sq mi)
- Demonym: Écullevillais
- Time zone: UTC+01:00 (CET)
  - Summer (DST): UTC+02:00 (CEST)
- Postal code: 50440
- ^{1} French Land Register data, which excludes lakes, ponds, glaciers > 1 km^{2} (0.386 sq mi or 247 acres) and river estuaries.

Éculleville (French pronunciation: [ekylvil]) is a former commune in the Manche department in Normandy in north-western France. On 1 January 2017, it was merged into the new commune La Hague.

== See also ==
- Communes of the Manche department
