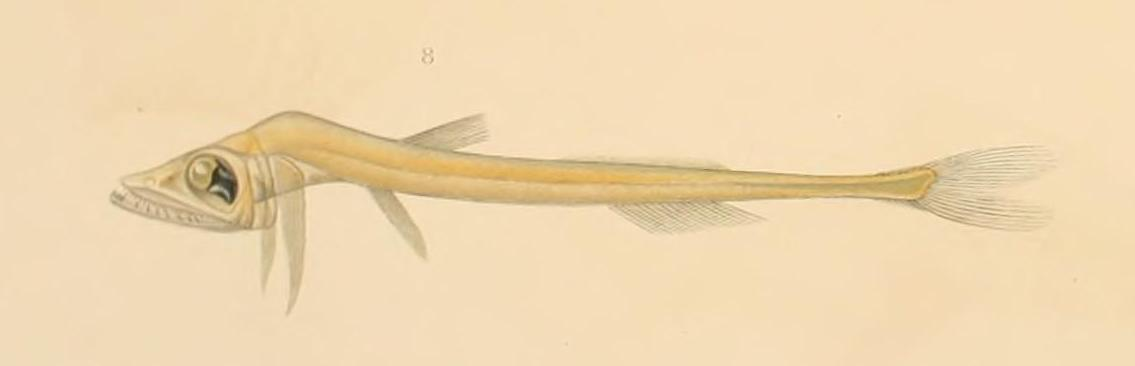
- Benthalbella infans

Scientific classification
- Kingdom: Animalia
- Phylum: Chordata
- Class: Actinopterygii
- Order: Aulopiformes
- Suborder: Alepisauroidei
- Family: Scopelarchidae; Alcock, 1896

Genera
- Benthalbella; Lagiacrusichthys; Rosenblattichthys; Scopelarchoides; Scopelarchus

= Pearleye =

Pearleyes

Family of ray-finned fishes

The pearleyes are a family, Scopelarchidae, of aulopiform ray-finned fish, distinguished by their unique visual system, with two retinas in each eye.

They are small to medium fish, ranging in size from just 3.7 cm (1.5 in) in adult length to 35 cm (14 in) in length, depending on species. They have a similar appearance to lizardfishes, with a large mouth, numerous teeth, and a forked tail. The dorsal fin is located in the middle of the back, with a small adipose fin.

Like many other deep-sea fish, their eyes are telescopic, allowing them to see in near darkness. However, unlike any other fishes, their eyes also possess a "pearl organ"; a white spot on the surface of the eye that may help to pick up light from the side of the fish, out of the normal visual field. The pearl organ is associated with a secondary retina, allowing the fish an unusually wide field of view. Specifically, pearleyes can see up to 20 degrees below the horizontal despite the nearly 40-degree angle created by the tubular eyes of the pearleye above the horizontal. While the majority of pearleye species are found in tropical waters, pearleyes have been found in every ocean in the world, including the Lagiacrusichthys, a newly described genus found in the Antarctic Ocean.

Pearleyes typically live between 500 and 1,000 m (1,640 and 3,280 ft), although some species may visit shallower waters during the night.
