= Canton of La Hague =

Administrative division in Manche, France

Coordinates: 49.66°N 1.70°W

The canton of La Hague is an administrative division of the Manche department, northwestern France. It was created at the French canton reorganisation which came into effect in March 2015. Its seat is in Cherbourg-en-Cotentin.

It consists of the following communes:

1. Cherbourg-en-Cotentin (partly: Querqueville)
2. La Hague
